

214001–214100 

|-bgcolor=#d6d6d6
| 214001 ||  || — || January 28, 2004 || Catalina || CSS || — || align=right | 5.5 km || 
|-id=002 bgcolor=#E9E9E9
| 214002 ||  || — || January 28, 2004 || Catalina || CSS || GEF || align=right | 2.3 km || 
|-id=003 bgcolor=#E9E9E9
| 214003 ||  || — || January 29, 2004 || Socorro || LINEAR || POS || align=right | 4.8 km || 
|-id=004 bgcolor=#E9E9E9
| 214004 ||  || — || February 2, 2004 || Catalina || CSS || HNS || align=right | 2.3 km || 
|-id=005 bgcolor=#E9E9E9
| 214005 ||  || — || February 12, 2004 || Goodricke-Pigott || R. A. Tucker || GEF || align=right | 2.3 km || 
|-id=006 bgcolor=#E9E9E9
| 214006 ||  || — || February 10, 2004 || Palomar || NEAT || — || align=right | 2.5 km || 
|-id=007 bgcolor=#E9E9E9
| 214007 ||  || — || February 11, 2004 || Palomar || NEAT || HEN || align=right | 1.6 km || 
|-id=008 bgcolor=#E9E9E9
| 214008 ||  || — || February 11, 2004 || Palomar || NEAT || DOR || align=right | 3.9 km || 
|-id=009 bgcolor=#E9E9E9
| 214009 ||  || — || February 11, 2004 || Kitt Peak || Spacewatch || — || align=right | 2.5 km || 
|-id=010 bgcolor=#E9E9E9
| 214010 ||  || — || February 11, 2004 || Palomar || NEAT || DOR || align=right | 3.3 km || 
|-id=011 bgcolor=#E9E9E9
| 214011 ||  || — || February 12, 2004 || Palomar || NEAT || — || align=right | 3.2 km || 
|-id=012 bgcolor=#E9E9E9
| 214012 ||  || — || February 14, 2004 || Palomar || NEAT || DOR || align=right | 5.3 km || 
|-id=013 bgcolor=#E9E9E9
| 214013 ||  || — || February 12, 2004 || Kitt Peak || Spacewatch || DOR || align=right | 2.9 km || 
|-id=014 bgcolor=#E9E9E9
| 214014 ||  || — || February 14, 2004 || Kitt Peak || Spacewatch || AEO || align=right | 1.5 km || 
|-id=015 bgcolor=#E9E9E9
| 214015 ||  || — || February 10, 2004 || Palomar || NEAT || — || align=right | 3.2 km || 
|-id=016 bgcolor=#E9E9E9
| 214016 ||  || — || February 16, 2004 || Desert Eagle || W. K. Y. Yeung || — || align=right | 3.6 km || 
|-id=017 bgcolor=#E9E9E9
| 214017 ||  || — || February 16, 2004 || Kitt Peak || Spacewatch || — || align=right | 3.0 km || 
|-id=018 bgcolor=#E9E9E9
| 214018 ||  || — || February 16, 2004 || Kitt Peak || Spacewatch || — || align=right | 2.7 km || 
|-id=019 bgcolor=#d6d6d6
| 214019 ||  || — || February 17, 2004 || Kitt Peak || Spacewatch || — || align=right | 3.1 km || 
|-id=020 bgcolor=#E9E9E9
| 214020 ||  || — || February 17, 2004 || Haleakala || NEAT || — || align=right | 3.6 km || 
|-id=021 bgcolor=#E9E9E9
| 214021 ||  || — || February 16, 2004 || Catalina || CSS || INO || align=right | 2.2 km || 
|-id=022 bgcolor=#d6d6d6
| 214022 ||  || — || February 18, 2004 || Catalina || CSS || ITH || align=right | 1.8 km || 
|-id=023 bgcolor=#E9E9E9
| 214023 ||  || — || February 19, 2004 || Socorro || LINEAR || — || align=right | 2.1 km || 
|-id=024 bgcolor=#E9E9E9
| 214024 ||  || — || February 16, 2004 || Kitt Peak || Spacewatch || — || align=right | 3.0 km || 
|-id=025 bgcolor=#E9E9E9
| 214025 ||  || — || February 19, 2004 || Socorro || LINEAR || GEF || align=right | 1.7 km || 
|-id=026 bgcolor=#E9E9E9
| 214026 ||  || — || February 22, 2004 || Kitt Peak || Spacewatch || ADE || align=right | 2.8 km || 
|-id=027 bgcolor=#E9E9E9
| 214027 ||  || — || February 19, 2004 || Socorro || LINEAR || — || align=right | 4.0 km || 
|-id=028 bgcolor=#E9E9E9
| 214028 ||  || — || February 20, 2004 || Haleakala || NEAT || — || align=right | 3.3 km || 
|-id=029 bgcolor=#E9E9E9
| 214029 ||  || — || February 26, 2004 || Socorro || LINEAR || AGN || align=right | 2.1 km || 
|-id=030 bgcolor=#E9E9E9
| 214030 ||  || — || March 11, 2004 || Palomar || NEAT || DOR || align=right | 3.2 km || 
|-id=031 bgcolor=#E9E9E9
| 214031 ||  || — || March 11, 2004 || Palomar || NEAT || EUN || align=right | 1.6 km || 
|-id=032 bgcolor=#E9E9E9
| 214032 ||  || — || March 11, 2004 || Palomar || NEAT || — || align=right | 3.2 km || 
|-id=033 bgcolor=#E9E9E9
| 214033 ||  || — || March 11, 2004 || Palomar || NEAT || — || align=right | 4.8 km || 
|-id=034 bgcolor=#E9E9E9
| 214034 ||  || — || March 11, 2004 || Palomar || NEAT || — || align=right | 3.1 km || 
|-id=035 bgcolor=#d6d6d6
| 214035 ||  || — || March 11, 2004 || Palomar || NEAT || — || align=right | 5.0 km || 
|-id=036 bgcolor=#d6d6d6
| 214036 ||  || — || March 11, 2004 || Palomar || NEAT || — || align=right | 4.7 km || 
|-id=037 bgcolor=#E9E9E9
| 214037 ||  || — || March 15, 2004 || Socorro || LINEAR || — || align=right | 3.0 km || 
|-id=038 bgcolor=#d6d6d6
| 214038 ||  || — || March 15, 2004 || Catalina || CSS || — || align=right | 2.9 km || 
|-id=039 bgcolor=#E9E9E9
| 214039 ||  || — || March 14, 2004 || Palomar || NEAT || — || align=right | 4.7 km || 
|-id=040 bgcolor=#E9E9E9
| 214040 ||  || — || March 15, 2004 || Socorro || LINEAR || GEF || align=right | 1.9 km || 
|-id=041 bgcolor=#E9E9E9
| 214041 ||  || — || March 12, 2004 || Palomar || NEAT || AER || align=right | 1.9 km || 
|-id=042 bgcolor=#d6d6d6
| 214042 ||  || — || March 13, 2004 || Palomar || NEAT || — || align=right | 2.7 km || 
|-id=043 bgcolor=#E9E9E9
| 214043 ||  || — || March 13, 2004 || Palomar || NEAT || — || align=right | 3.2 km || 
|-id=044 bgcolor=#E9E9E9
| 214044 ||  || — || March 14, 2004 || Socorro || LINEAR || — || align=right | 3.3 km || 
|-id=045 bgcolor=#d6d6d6
| 214045 ||  || — || March 14, 2004 || Catalina || CSS || EMA || align=right | 6.5 km || 
|-id=046 bgcolor=#E9E9E9
| 214046 ||  || — || March 15, 2004 || Socorro || LINEAR || — || align=right | 2.6 km || 
|-id=047 bgcolor=#E9E9E9
| 214047 ||  || — || March 13, 2004 || Palomar || NEAT || — || align=right | 3.6 km || 
|-id=048 bgcolor=#E9E9E9
| 214048 ||  || — || March 15, 2004 || Kitt Peak || Spacewatch || HOF || align=right | 3.2 km || 
|-id=049 bgcolor=#E9E9E9
| 214049 ||  || — || March 14, 2004 || Socorro || LINEAR || — || align=right | 3.8 km || 
|-id=050 bgcolor=#d6d6d6
| 214050 ||  || — || March 16, 2004 || Valmeca || Valmeca Obs. || — || align=right | 3.5 km || 
|-id=051 bgcolor=#E9E9E9
| 214051 ||  || — || March 16, 2004 || Kitt Peak || Spacewatch || — || align=right | 3.6 km || 
|-id=052 bgcolor=#d6d6d6
| 214052 ||  || — || March 17, 2004 || Kitt Peak || Spacewatch || — || align=right | 4.0 km || 
|-id=053 bgcolor=#d6d6d6
| 214053 ||  || — || March 16, 2004 || Socorro || LINEAR || — || align=right | 3.7 km || 
|-id=054 bgcolor=#E9E9E9
| 214054 ||  || — || March 17, 2004 || Kitt Peak || Spacewatch || — || align=right | 2.5 km || 
|-id=055 bgcolor=#E9E9E9
| 214055 ||  || — || March 18, 2004 || Kitt Peak || Spacewatch || — || align=right | 2.3 km || 
|-id=056 bgcolor=#E9E9E9
| 214056 ||  || — || March 19, 2004 || Palomar || NEAT || — || align=right | 3.6 km || 
|-id=057 bgcolor=#d6d6d6
| 214057 ||  || — || March 19, 2004 || Socorro || LINEAR || — || align=right | 3.7 km || 
|-id=058 bgcolor=#E9E9E9
| 214058 ||  || — || March 16, 2004 || Kitt Peak || Spacewatch || EUN || align=right | 1.4 km || 
|-id=059 bgcolor=#E9E9E9
| 214059 ||  || — || March 18, 2004 || Catalina || CSS || — || align=right | 2.8 km || 
|-id=060 bgcolor=#E9E9E9
| 214060 ||  || — || March 20, 2004 || Kitt Peak || Spacewatch || DOR || align=right | 3.9 km || 
|-id=061 bgcolor=#E9E9E9
| 214061 ||  || — || March 19, 2004 || Palomar || NEAT || INO || align=right | 1.6 km || 
|-id=062 bgcolor=#E9E9E9
| 214062 ||  || — || March 23, 2004 || Socorro || LINEAR || — || align=right | 2.4 km || 
|-id=063 bgcolor=#E9E9E9
| 214063 ||  || — || March 23, 2004 || Socorro || LINEAR || — || align=right | 3.7 km || 
|-id=064 bgcolor=#d6d6d6
| 214064 ||  || — || March 22, 2004 || Socorro || LINEAR || — || align=right | 3.1 km || 
|-id=065 bgcolor=#E9E9E9
| 214065 ||  || — || March 23, 2004 || Kitt Peak || Spacewatch || CLO || align=right | 3.1 km || 
|-id=066 bgcolor=#d6d6d6
| 214066 ||  || — || March 24, 2004 || Anderson Mesa || LONEOS || — || align=right | 3.9 km || 
|-id=067 bgcolor=#E9E9E9
| 214067 ||  || — || March 26, 2004 || Socorro || LINEAR || — || align=right | 3.5 km || 
|-id=068 bgcolor=#d6d6d6
| 214068 ||  || — || April 11, 2004 || Catalina || CSS || LIX || align=right | 5.1 km || 
|-id=069 bgcolor=#E9E9E9
| 214069 ||  || — || April 12, 2004 || Kitt Peak || Spacewatch || — || align=right | 2.3 km || 
|-id=070 bgcolor=#d6d6d6
| 214070 ||  || — || April 12, 2004 || Anderson Mesa || LONEOS || — || align=right | 5.3 km || 
|-id=071 bgcolor=#d6d6d6
| 214071 ||  || — || April 12, 2004 || Palomar || NEAT || EOS || align=right | 3.2 km || 
|-id=072 bgcolor=#d6d6d6
| 214072 ||  || — || April 9, 2004 || Siding Spring || SSS || TRP || align=right | 4.5 km || 
|-id=073 bgcolor=#E9E9E9
| 214073 ||  || — || April 12, 2004 || Kitt Peak || Spacewatch || — || align=right | 2.5 km || 
|-id=074 bgcolor=#d6d6d6
| 214074 ||  || — || April 13, 2004 || Kitt Peak || Spacewatch || — || align=right | 3.1 km || 
|-id=075 bgcolor=#E9E9E9
| 214075 ||  || — || April 14, 2004 || Kitt Peak || Spacewatch || — || align=right | 3.6 km || 
|-id=076 bgcolor=#d6d6d6
| 214076 ||  || — || April 14, 2004 || Kitt Peak || Spacewatch || — || align=right | 2.7 km || 
|-id=077 bgcolor=#d6d6d6
| 214077 ||  || — || April 12, 2004 || Kitt Peak || Spacewatch || — || align=right | 5.3 km || 
|-id=078 bgcolor=#d6d6d6
| 214078 ||  || — || April 19, 2004 || Goodricke-Pigott || Goodricke-Pigott Obs. || — || align=right | 4.7 km || 
|-id=079 bgcolor=#d6d6d6
| 214079 ||  || — || April 19, 2004 || Socorro || LINEAR || — || align=right | 3.9 km || 
|-id=080 bgcolor=#d6d6d6
| 214080 ||  || — || April 16, 2004 || Anderson Mesa || LONEOS || LIX || align=right | 4.5 km || 
|-id=081 bgcolor=#d6d6d6
| 214081 Balavoine ||  ||  || April 17, 2004 || Nogales || M. Ory || — || align=right | 4.0 km || 
|-id=082 bgcolor=#d6d6d6
| 214082 ||  || — || April 19, 2004 || Socorro || LINEAR || — || align=right | 6.3 km || 
|-id=083 bgcolor=#d6d6d6
| 214083 ||  || — || April 21, 2004 || Kitt Peak || Spacewatch || — || align=right | 2.5 km || 
|-id=084 bgcolor=#E9E9E9
| 214084 ||  || — || April 30, 2004 || Reedy Creek || J. Broughton || — || align=right | 1.3 km || 
|-id=085 bgcolor=#d6d6d6
| 214085 ||  || — || April 30, 2004 || Kitt Peak || Spacewatch || — || align=right | 5.0 km || 
|-id=086 bgcolor=#d6d6d6
| 214086 ||  || — || May 9, 2004 || Kitt Peak || Spacewatch || — || align=right | 3.9 km || 
|-id=087 bgcolor=#d6d6d6
| 214087 ||  || — || May 12, 2004 || Socorro || LINEAR || EUP || align=right | 5.5 km || 
|-id=088 bgcolor=#FFC2E0
| 214088 ||  || — || May 15, 2004 || Socorro || LINEAR || APO +1km || align=right | 2.4 km || 
|-id=089 bgcolor=#d6d6d6
| 214089 ||  || — || May 14, 2004 || Palomar || NEAT || — || align=right | 3.1 km || 
|-id=090 bgcolor=#d6d6d6
| 214090 ||  || — || May 9, 2004 || Kitt Peak || Spacewatch || THM || align=right | 3.2 km || 
|-id=091 bgcolor=#d6d6d6
| 214091 ||  || — || May 15, 2004 || Socorro || LINEAR || — || align=right | 4.9 km || 
|-id=092 bgcolor=#fefefe
| 214092 ||  || — || May 14, 2004 || Socorro || LINEAR || H || align=right | 1.1 km || 
|-id=093 bgcolor=#C2FFFF
| 214093 ||  || — || May 10, 2004 || Kitt Peak || Spacewatch || L4 || align=right | 16 km || 
|-id=094 bgcolor=#d6d6d6
| 214094 ||  || — || May 19, 2004 || Kitt Peak || Spacewatch || EOS || align=right | 2.4 km || 
|-id=095 bgcolor=#d6d6d6
| 214095 ||  || — || June 11, 2004 || Palomar || NEAT || — || align=right | 2.7 km || 
|-id=096 bgcolor=#d6d6d6
| 214096 ||  || — || June 12, 2004 || Siding Spring || SSS || — || align=right | 5.1 km || 
|-id=097 bgcolor=#d6d6d6
| 214097 ||  || — || July 9, 2004 || Socorro || LINEAR || — || align=right | 5.6 km || 
|-id=098 bgcolor=#d6d6d6
| 214098 ||  || — || July 11, 2004 || Socorro || LINEAR || THB || align=right | 5.3 km || 
|-id=099 bgcolor=#d6d6d6
| 214099 ||  || — || July 11, 2004 || Socorro || LINEAR || 7:4 || align=right | 5.9 km || 
|-id=100 bgcolor=#d6d6d6
| 214100 ||  || — || July 18, 2004 || Reedy Creek || J. Broughton || — || align=right | 4.3 km || 
|}

214101–214200 

|-bgcolor=#d6d6d6
| 214101 ||  || — || July 16, 2004 || Socorro || LINEAR || THM || align=right | 3.8 km || 
|-id=102 bgcolor=#d6d6d6
| 214102 ||  || — || August 9, 2004 || Socorro || LINEAR || HYG || align=right | 4.9 km || 
|-id=103 bgcolor=#E9E9E9
| 214103 ||  || — || August 10, 2004 || Anderson Mesa || LONEOS || — || align=right | 1.5 km || 
|-id=104 bgcolor=#d6d6d6
| 214104 ||  || — || August 8, 2004 || Campo Imperatore || CINEOS || — || align=right | 4.3 km || 
|-id=105 bgcolor=#fefefe
| 214105 ||  || — || August 20, 2004 || Siding Spring || SSS || H || align=right data-sort-value="0.79" | 790 m || 
|-id=106 bgcolor=#d6d6d6
| 214106 ||  || — || August 20, 2004 || Siding Spring || SSS || — || align=right | 3.2 km || 
|-id=107 bgcolor=#fefefe
| 214107 ||  || — || September 7, 2004 || Socorro || LINEAR || — || align=right data-sort-value="0.97" | 970 m || 
|-id=108 bgcolor=#E9E9E9
| 214108 ||  || — || September 8, 2004 || Socorro || LINEAR || — || align=right | 1.4 km || 
|-id=109 bgcolor=#fefefe
| 214109 ||  || — || September 10, 2004 || Socorro || LINEAR || — || align=right | 1.0 km || 
|-id=110 bgcolor=#d6d6d6
| 214110 ||  || — || September 10, 2004 || Socorro || LINEAR || URS || align=right | 4.8 km || 
|-id=111 bgcolor=#fefefe
| 214111 ||  || — || September 10, 2004 || Socorro || LINEAR || — || align=right | 1.0 km || 
|-id=112 bgcolor=#d6d6d6
| 214112 ||  || — || September 12, 2004 || Socorro || LINEAR || — || align=right | 6.7 km || 
|-id=113 bgcolor=#d6d6d6
| 214113 ||  || — || September 7, 2004 || Socorro || LINEAR || 7:4 || align=right | 4.9 km || 
|-id=114 bgcolor=#fefefe
| 214114 ||  || — || September 17, 2004 || Kitt Peak || Spacewatch || — || align=right | 1.0 km || 
|-id=115 bgcolor=#fefefe
| 214115 ||  || — || October 4, 2004 || Kitt Peak || Spacewatch || MAS || align=right | 1.1 km || 
|-id=116 bgcolor=#d6d6d6
| 214116 ||  || — || October 5, 2004 || Kitt Peak || Spacewatch || — || align=right | 4.3 km || 
|-id=117 bgcolor=#fefefe
| 214117 ||  || — || October 6, 2004 || Kitt Peak || Spacewatch || — || align=right | 1.0 km || 
|-id=118 bgcolor=#E9E9E9
| 214118 ||  || — || November 4, 2004 || Kitt Peak || Spacewatch || MIS || align=right | 3.0 km || 
|-id=119 bgcolor=#E9E9E9
| 214119 ||  || — || November 10, 2004 || Socorro || LINEAR || BAR || align=right | 2.4 km || 
|-id=120 bgcolor=#fefefe
| 214120 ||  || — || November 12, 2004 || Catalina || CSS || — || align=right data-sort-value="0.73" | 730 m || 
|-id=121 bgcolor=#fefefe
| 214121 ||  || — || December 10, 2004 || Socorro || LINEAR || NYS || align=right data-sort-value="0.70" | 700 m || 
|-id=122 bgcolor=#fefefe
| 214122 ||  || — || December 11, 2004 || Kitt Peak || Spacewatch || — || align=right data-sort-value="0.79" | 790 m || 
|-id=123 bgcolor=#fefefe
| 214123 ||  || — || December 11, 2004 || Socorro || LINEAR || — || align=right | 1.2 km || 
|-id=124 bgcolor=#fefefe
| 214124 ||  || — || December 12, 2004 || Kitt Peak || Spacewatch || — || align=right | 1.5 km || 
|-id=125 bgcolor=#fefefe
| 214125 ||  || — || December 13, 2004 || Kitt Peak || Spacewatch || — || align=right | 1.1 km || 
|-id=126 bgcolor=#fefefe
| 214126 ||  || — || December 11, 2004 || Kitt Peak || Spacewatch || — || align=right | 1.2 km || 
|-id=127 bgcolor=#fefefe
| 214127 ||  || — || December 11, 2004 || Kitt Peak || Spacewatch || — || align=right data-sort-value="0.79" | 790 m || 
|-id=128 bgcolor=#fefefe
| 214128 ||  || — || December 11, 2004 || Kitt Peak || Spacewatch || — || align=right | 1.1 km || 
|-id=129 bgcolor=#fefefe
| 214129 ||  || — || December 15, 2004 || Socorro || LINEAR || — || align=right | 1.3 km || 
|-id=130 bgcolor=#fefefe
| 214130 ||  || — || December 18, 2004 || Mount Lemmon || Mount Lemmon Survey || — || align=right data-sort-value="0.76" | 760 m || 
|-id=131 bgcolor=#fefefe
| 214131 ||  || — || January 5, 2005 || Pla D'Arguines || Pla D'Arguines Obs. || — || align=right data-sort-value="0.85" | 850 m || 
|-id=132 bgcolor=#fefefe
| 214132 ||  || — || January 6, 2005 || Catalina || CSS || FLO || align=right | 1.0 km || 
|-id=133 bgcolor=#fefefe
| 214133 ||  || — || January 6, 2005 || Socorro || LINEAR || — || align=right | 1.0 km || 
|-id=134 bgcolor=#fefefe
| 214134 ||  || — || January 7, 2005 || Catalina || CSS || FLO || align=right data-sort-value="0.85" | 850 m || 
|-id=135 bgcolor=#fefefe
| 214135 ||  || — || January 6, 2005 || Socorro || LINEAR || — || align=right | 2.2 km || 
|-id=136 bgcolor=#fefefe
| 214136 Alinghi ||  ||  || January 13, 2005 || Vicques || M. Ory || FLO || align=right data-sort-value="0.83" | 830 m || 
|-id=137 bgcolor=#fefefe
| 214137 ||  || — || January 6, 2005 || Catalina || CSS || — || align=right | 1.4 km || 
|-id=138 bgcolor=#fefefe
| 214138 ||  || — || January 13, 2005 || Socorro || LINEAR || — || align=right | 1.3 km || 
|-id=139 bgcolor=#fefefe
| 214139 ||  || — || January 11, 2005 || Socorro || LINEAR || NYS || align=right data-sort-value="0.94" | 940 m || 
|-id=140 bgcolor=#fefefe
| 214140 ||  || — || January 13, 2005 || Kitt Peak || Spacewatch || — || align=right | 1.3 km || 
|-id=141 bgcolor=#fefefe
| 214141 ||  || — || January 13, 2005 || Socorro || LINEAR || — || align=right | 1.1 km || 
|-id=142 bgcolor=#E9E9E9
| 214142 ||  || — || January 15, 2005 || Catalina || CSS || EUN || align=right | 2.0 km || 
|-id=143 bgcolor=#fefefe
| 214143 ||  || — || January 15, 2005 || Kitt Peak || Spacewatch || NYS || align=right data-sort-value="0.86" | 860 m || 
|-id=144 bgcolor=#fefefe
| 214144 ||  || — || January 13, 2005 || Kitt Peak || Spacewatch || — || align=right data-sort-value="0.84" | 840 m || 
|-id=145 bgcolor=#fefefe
| 214145 ||  || — || January 15, 2005 || Catalina || CSS || — || align=right | 1.2 km || 
|-id=146 bgcolor=#fefefe
| 214146 ||  || — || January 15, 2005 || Kitt Peak || Spacewatch || — || align=right | 1.1 km || 
|-id=147 bgcolor=#fefefe
| 214147 ||  || — || January 15, 2005 || Kitt Peak || Spacewatch || FLO || align=right data-sort-value="0.92" | 920 m || 
|-id=148 bgcolor=#fefefe
| 214148 ||  || — || January 16, 2005 || Socorro || LINEAR || — || align=right | 1.0 km || 
|-id=149 bgcolor=#fefefe
| 214149 ||  || — || January 16, 2005 || Socorro || LINEAR || — || align=right | 1.2 km || 
|-id=150 bgcolor=#fefefe
| 214150 ||  || — || January 16, 2005 || Kitt Peak || Spacewatch || MAS || align=right data-sort-value="0.77" | 770 m || 
|-id=151 bgcolor=#fefefe
| 214151 ||  || — || January 16, 2005 || Kitt Peak || Spacewatch || ERI || align=right | 3.0 km || 
|-id=152 bgcolor=#fefefe
| 214152 ||  || — || January 16, 2005 || Kitt Peak || Spacewatch || NYS || align=right data-sort-value="0.92" | 920 m || 
|-id=153 bgcolor=#fefefe
| 214153 ||  || — || January 31, 2005 || Palomar || NEAT || — || align=right | 1.0 km || 
|-id=154 bgcolor=#fefefe
| 214154 ||  || — || February 1, 2005 || Kitt Peak || Spacewatch || MAS || align=right data-sort-value="0.94" | 940 m || 
|-id=155 bgcolor=#fefefe
| 214155 ||  || — || February 1, 2005 || Kitt Peak || Spacewatch || FLO || align=right data-sort-value="0.95" | 950 m || 
|-id=156 bgcolor=#fefefe
| 214156 ||  || — || February 1, 2005 || Kitt Peak || Spacewatch || NYS || align=right data-sort-value="0.83" | 830 m || 
|-id=157 bgcolor=#fefefe
| 214157 ||  || — || February 2, 2005 || Kitt Peak || Spacewatch || MAS || align=right data-sort-value="0.81" | 810 m || 
|-id=158 bgcolor=#fefefe
| 214158 ||  || — || February 2, 2005 || Socorro || LINEAR || NYS || align=right data-sort-value="0.88" | 880 m || 
|-id=159 bgcolor=#fefefe
| 214159 ||  || — || February 2, 2005 || Catalina || CSS || ERI || align=right | 3.2 km || 
|-id=160 bgcolor=#fefefe
| 214160 ||  || — || February 2, 2005 || Catalina || CSS || NYS || align=right data-sort-value="0.92" | 920 m || 
|-id=161 bgcolor=#fefefe
| 214161 ||  || — || February 2, 2005 || Catalina || CSS || — || align=right | 1.4 km || 
|-id=162 bgcolor=#fefefe
| 214162 ||  || — || February 2, 2005 || Catalina || CSS || — || align=right | 1.1 km || 
|-id=163 bgcolor=#fefefe
| 214163 ||  || — || February 1, 2005 || Catalina || CSS || — || align=right | 1.3 km || 
|-id=164 bgcolor=#fefefe
| 214164 ||  || — || February 1, 2005 || Catalina || CSS || — || align=right | 1.4 km || 
|-id=165 bgcolor=#fefefe
| 214165 ||  || — || February 2, 2005 || Catalina || CSS || V || align=right data-sort-value="0.97" | 970 m || 
|-id=166 bgcolor=#d6d6d6
| 214166 ||  || — || February 1, 2005 || Kitt Peak || Spacewatch || ANF || align=right | 2.0 km || 
|-id=167 bgcolor=#fefefe
| 214167 ||  || — || February 3, 2005 || Socorro || LINEAR || — || align=right | 1.4 km || 
|-id=168 bgcolor=#fefefe
| 214168 ||  || — || February 2, 2005 || Catalina || CSS || NYS || align=right data-sort-value="0.93" | 930 m || 
|-id=169 bgcolor=#fefefe
| 214169 ||  || — || February 2, 2005 || Catalina || CSS || NYS || align=right | 1.2 km || 
|-id=170 bgcolor=#fefefe
| 214170 ||  || — || February 2, 2005 || Socorro || LINEAR || MAS || align=right | 1.0 km || 
|-id=171 bgcolor=#fefefe
| 214171 ||  || — || February 2, 2005 || Kitt Peak || Spacewatch || — || align=right | 1.1 km || 
|-id=172 bgcolor=#fefefe
| 214172 ||  || — || February 3, 2005 || Socorro || LINEAR || NYS || align=right data-sort-value="0.94" | 940 m || 
|-id=173 bgcolor=#fefefe
| 214173 ||  || — || February 4, 2005 || Socorro || LINEAR || MAS || align=right | 1.1 km || 
|-id=174 bgcolor=#fefefe
| 214174 ||  || — || February 9, 2005 || Mount Lemmon || Mount Lemmon Survey || FLO || align=right data-sort-value="0.80" | 800 m || 
|-id=175 bgcolor=#fefefe
| 214175 ||  || — || February 9, 2005 || Anderson Mesa || LONEOS || — || align=right | 1.1 km || 
|-id=176 bgcolor=#fefefe
| 214176 ||  || — || February 9, 2005 || Socorro || LINEAR || NYS || align=right | 2.5 km || 
|-id=177 bgcolor=#fefefe
| 214177 ||  || — || February 2, 2005 || Kitt Peak || Spacewatch || MAS || align=right | 1.0 km || 
|-id=178 bgcolor=#fefefe
| 214178 ||  || — || February 4, 2005 || Anderson Mesa || LONEOS || MAS || align=right data-sort-value="0.89" | 890 m || 
|-id=179 bgcolor=#fefefe
| 214179 ||  || — || February 14, 2005 || Socorro || LINEAR || MAS || align=right data-sort-value="0.76" | 760 m || 
|-id=180 bgcolor=#E9E9E9
| 214180 Mabaglioni ||  ||  || February 9, 2005 || La Silla || A. Boattini, H. Scholl || — || align=right | 4.0 km || 
|-id=181 bgcolor=#fefefe
| 214181 ||  || — || February 1, 2005 || Kitt Peak || Spacewatch || MAS || align=right data-sort-value="0.86" | 860 m || 
|-id=182 bgcolor=#E9E9E9
| 214182 ||  || — || March 2, 2005 || Great Shefford || P. Birtwhistle || — || align=right | 1.1 km || 
|-id=183 bgcolor=#fefefe
| 214183 ||  || — || March 1, 2005 || Kitt Peak || Spacewatch || KLI || align=right | 2.4 km || 
|-id=184 bgcolor=#fefefe
| 214184 ||  || — || March 1, 2005 || Kitt Peak || Spacewatch || — || align=right | 1.2 km || 
|-id=185 bgcolor=#fefefe
| 214185 ||  || — || March 2, 2005 || Kitt Peak || Spacewatch || V || align=right data-sort-value="0.76" | 760 m || 
|-id=186 bgcolor=#fefefe
| 214186 ||  || — || March 2, 2005 || Kitt Peak || Spacewatch || NYS || align=right | 2.7 km || 
|-id=187 bgcolor=#fefefe
| 214187 ||  || — || March 2, 2005 || Kitt Peak || Spacewatch || NYS || align=right data-sort-value="0.75" | 750 m || 
|-id=188 bgcolor=#fefefe
| 214188 ||  || — || March 2, 2005 || Catalina || CSS || MAS || align=right data-sort-value="0.98" | 980 m || 
|-id=189 bgcolor=#fefefe
| 214189 ||  || — || March 2, 2005 || Catalina || CSS || — || align=right | 1.1 km || 
|-id=190 bgcolor=#fefefe
| 214190 ||  || — || March 3, 2005 || Kitt Peak || Spacewatch || FLO || align=right | 1.1 km || 
|-id=191 bgcolor=#fefefe
| 214191 ||  || — || March 3, 2005 || Kitt Peak || Spacewatch || V || align=right | 1.1 km || 
|-id=192 bgcolor=#fefefe
| 214192 ||  || — || March 3, 2005 || Kitt Peak || Spacewatch || — || align=right | 1.1 km || 
|-id=193 bgcolor=#fefefe
| 214193 ||  || — || March 3, 2005 || Catalina || CSS || NYS || align=right data-sort-value="0.85" | 850 m || 
|-id=194 bgcolor=#fefefe
| 214194 ||  || — || March 3, 2005 || Catalina || CSS || V || align=right data-sort-value="0.94" | 940 m || 
|-id=195 bgcolor=#fefefe
| 214195 ||  || — || March 2, 2005 || Calvin-Rehoboth || Calvin–Rehoboth Obs. || V || align=right data-sort-value="0.67" | 670 m || 
|-id=196 bgcolor=#E9E9E9
| 214196 ||  || — || March 6, 2005 || La Silla || R. Gauderon, R. Behrend || — || align=right | 2.2 km || 
|-id=197 bgcolor=#fefefe
| 214197 ||  || — || March 3, 2005 || Catalina || CSS || PHO || align=right | 2.2 km || 
|-id=198 bgcolor=#fefefe
| 214198 ||  || — || March 8, 2005 || Mayhill || A. Lowe || MAS || align=right | 1.0 km || 
|-id=199 bgcolor=#fefefe
| 214199 ||  || — || March 1, 2005 || Kitt Peak || Spacewatch || NYS || align=right | 1.1 km || 
|-id=200 bgcolor=#fefefe
| 214200 ||  || — || March 1, 2005 || Kitt Peak || Spacewatch || — || align=right | 1.4 km || 
|}

214201–214300 

|-bgcolor=#fefefe
| 214201 ||  || — || March 3, 2005 || Catalina || CSS || NYS || align=right | 2.6 km || 
|-id=202 bgcolor=#fefefe
| 214202 ||  || — || March 3, 2005 || Catalina || CSS || V || align=right data-sort-value="0.97" | 970 m || 
|-id=203 bgcolor=#fefefe
| 214203 ||  || — || March 4, 2005 || Kitt Peak || Spacewatch || MAS || align=right | 1.0 km || 
|-id=204 bgcolor=#E9E9E9
| 214204 ||  || — || March 4, 2005 || Catalina || CSS || — || align=right | 1.2 km || 
|-id=205 bgcolor=#fefefe
| 214205 ||  || — || March 4, 2005 || Catalina || CSS || — || align=right | 1.4 km || 
|-id=206 bgcolor=#fefefe
| 214206 ||  || — || March 4, 2005 || Mount Lemmon || Mount Lemmon Survey || — || align=right data-sort-value="0.97" | 970 m || 
|-id=207 bgcolor=#fefefe
| 214207 ||  || — || March 4, 2005 || Socorro || LINEAR || MAS || align=right data-sort-value="0.92" | 920 m || 
|-id=208 bgcolor=#fefefe
| 214208 ||  || — || March 4, 2005 || Mount Lemmon || Mount Lemmon Survey || NYS || align=right data-sort-value="0.67" | 670 m || 
|-id=209 bgcolor=#fefefe
| 214209 ||  || — || March 2, 2005 || Catalina || CSS || FLO || align=right | 1.1 km || 
|-id=210 bgcolor=#fefefe
| 214210 ||  || — || March 2, 2005 || Catalina || CSS || — || align=right | 1.3 km || 
|-id=211 bgcolor=#fefefe
| 214211 ||  || — || March 3, 2005 || Kitt Peak || Spacewatch || MAS || align=right data-sort-value="0.88" | 880 m || 
|-id=212 bgcolor=#fefefe
| 214212 ||  || — || March 3, 2005 || Kitt Peak || Spacewatch || NYS || align=right data-sort-value="0.85" | 850 m || 
|-id=213 bgcolor=#fefefe
| 214213 ||  || — || March 3, 2005 || Catalina || CSS || NYS || align=right data-sort-value="0.86" | 860 m || 
|-id=214 bgcolor=#fefefe
| 214214 ||  || — || March 3, 2005 || Catalina || CSS || — || align=right | 1.4 km || 
|-id=215 bgcolor=#fefefe
| 214215 ||  || — || March 4, 2005 || Kitt Peak || Spacewatch || V || align=right data-sort-value="0.87" | 870 m || 
|-id=216 bgcolor=#fefefe
| 214216 ||  || — || March 4, 2005 || Socorro || LINEAR || MAS || align=right data-sort-value="0.91" | 910 m || 
|-id=217 bgcolor=#fefefe
| 214217 ||  || — || March 4, 2005 || Socorro || LINEAR || NYS || align=right data-sort-value="0.98" | 980 m || 
|-id=218 bgcolor=#fefefe
| 214218 ||  || — || March 4, 2005 || Socorro || LINEAR || V || align=right | 1.2 km || 
|-id=219 bgcolor=#fefefe
| 214219 ||  || — || March 8, 2005 || Mount Lemmon || Mount Lemmon Survey || — || align=right | 1.1 km || 
|-id=220 bgcolor=#fefefe
| 214220 ||  || — || March 10, 2005 || Goodricke-Pigott || R. A. Tucker || MAS || align=right | 1.0 km || 
|-id=221 bgcolor=#fefefe
| 214221 ||  || — || March 3, 2005 || Catalina || CSS || — || align=right | 1.5 km || 
|-id=222 bgcolor=#fefefe
| 214222 ||  || — || March 4, 2005 || Mount Lemmon || Mount Lemmon Survey || MAS || align=right data-sort-value="0.80" | 800 m || 
|-id=223 bgcolor=#E9E9E9
| 214223 ||  || — || March 8, 2005 || Mount Lemmon || Mount Lemmon Survey || DOR || align=right | 2.9 km || 
|-id=224 bgcolor=#fefefe
| 214224 ||  || — || March 9, 2005 || Socorro || LINEAR || — || align=right | 1.1 km || 
|-id=225 bgcolor=#fefefe
| 214225 ||  || — || March 9, 2005 || Anderson Mesa || LONEOS || NYS || align=right data-sort-value="0.85" | 850 m || 
|-id=226 bgcolor=#fefefe
| 214226 ||  || — || March 10, 2005 || Catalina || CSS || V || align=right data-sort-value="0.94" | 940 m || 
|-id=227 bgcolor=#fefefe
| 214227 ||  || — || March 10, 2005 || Mount Lemmon || Mount Lemmon Survey || — || align=right data-sort-value="0.92" | 920 m || 
|-id=228 bgcolor=#fefefe
| 214228 ||  || — || March 10, 2005 || Kitt Peak || Spacewatch || NYS || align=right data-sort-value="0.88" | 880 m || 
|-id=229 bgcolor=#fefefe
| 214229 ||  || — || March 10, 2005 || Kitt Peak || Spacewatch || NYS || align=right data-sort-value="0.94" | 940 m || 
|-id=230 bgcolor=#E9E9E9
| 214230 ||  || — || March 10, 2005 || Kitt Peak || Spacewatch || — || align=right data-sort-value="0.85" | 850 m || 
|-id=231 bgcolor=#fefefe
| 214231 ||  || — || March 11, 2005 || Catalina || CSS || — || align=right | 1.8 km || 
|-id=232 bgcolor=#fefefe
| 214232 ||  || — || March 8, 2005 || Mount Lemmon || Mount Lemmon Survey || — || align=right data-sort-value="0.89" | 890 m || 
|-id=233 bgcolor=#fefefe
| 214233 ||  || — || March 9, 2005 || Mount Lemmon || Mount Lemmon Survey || MAS || align=right | 1.1 km || 
|-id=234 bgcolor=#fefefe
| 214234 ||  || — || March 11, 2005 || Kitt Peak || Spacewatch || MAS || align=right data-sort-value="0.95" | 950 m || 
|-id=235 bgcolor=#fefefe
| 214235 ||  || — || March 8, 2005 || Mount Lemmon || Mount Lemmon Survey || — || align=right | 1.0 km || 
|-id=236 bgcolor=#fefefe
| 214236 ||  || — || March 8, 2005 || Mount Lemmon || Mount Lemmon Survey || NYS || align=right data-sort-value="0.88" | 880 m || 
|-id=237 bgcolor=#fefefe
| 214237 ||  || — || March 9, 2005 || Socorro || LINEAR || — || align=right | 1.2 km || 
|-id=238 bgcolor=#fefefe
| 214238 ||  || — || March 9, 2005 || Socorro || LINEAR || NYS || align=right | 1.0 km || 
|-id=239 bgcolor=#fefefe
| 214239 ||  || — || March 9, 2005 || Socorro || LINEAR || MAS || align=right | 1.1 km || 
|-id=240 bgcolor=#fefefe
| 214240 ||  || — || March 9, 2005 || Mount Lemmon || Mount Lemmon Survey || V || align=right data-sort-value="0.94" | 940 m || 
|-id=241 bgcolor=#fefefe
| 214241 ||  || — || March 10, 2005 || Catalina || CSS || — || align=right | 1.1 km || 
|-id=242 bgcolor=#fefefe
| 214242 ||  || — || March 10, 2005 || Mount Lemmon || Mount Lemmon Survey || NYS || align=right data-sort-value="0.95" | 950 m || 
|-id=243 bgcolor=#fefefe
| 214243 ||  || — || March 8, 2005 || Socorro || LINEAR || — || align=right | 1.4 km || 
|-id=244 bgcolor=#fefefe
| 214244 ||  || — || March 10, 2005 || Mount Lemmon || Mount Lemmon Survey || MAS || align=right data-sort-value="0.84" | 840 m || 
|-id=245 bgcolor=#fefefe
| 214245 ||  || — || March 10, 2005 || Mount Lemmon || Mount Lemmon Survey || NYS || align=right data-sort-value="0.78" | 780 m || 
|-id=246 bgcolor=#E9E9E9
| 214246 ||  || — || March 10, 2005 || Mount Lemmon || Mount Lemmon Survey || — || align=right | 1.5 km || 
|-id=247 bgcolor=#fefefe
| 214247 ||  || — || March 11, 2005 || Mount Lemmon || Mount Lemmon Survey || NYS || align=right | 1.3 km || 
|-id=248 bgcolor=#fefefe
| 214248 ||  || — || March 12, 2005 || Kitt Peak || Spacewatch || — || align=right | 1.4 km || 
|-id=249 bgcolor=#fefefe
| 214249 ||  || — || March 11, 2005 || Catalina || CSS || V || align=right | 1.1 km || 
|-id=250 bgcolor=#fefefe
| 214250 ||  || — || March 8, 2005 || Kitt Peak || Spacewatch || — || align=right | 1.2 km || 
|-id=251 bgcolor=#fefefe
| 214251 ||  || — || March 10, 2005 || Catalina || CSS || V || align=right data-sort-value="0.91" | 910 m || 
|-id=252 bgcolor=#E9E9E9
| 214252 ||  || — || March 11, 2005 || Catalina || CSS || — || align=right | 2.0 km || 
|-id=253 bgcolor=#fefefe
| 214253 ||  || — || March 8, 2005 || Mount Lemmon || Mount Lemmon Survey || — || align=right | 1.0 km || 
|-id=254 bgcolor=#fefefe
| 214254 ||  || — || March 10, 2005 || Mount Lemmon || Mount Lemmon Survey || — || align=right | 1.1 km || 
|-id=255 bgcolor=#E9E9E9
| 214255 ||  || — || March 11, 2005 || Mount Lemmon || Mount Lemmon Survey || — || align=right | 1.8 km || 
|-id=256 bgcolor=#fefefe
| 214256 ||  || — || March 16, 2005 || Mayhill || A. Lowe || CIM || align=right | 3.2 km || 
|-id=257 bgcolor=#E9E9E9
| 214257 ||  || — || April 1, 2005 || Junk Bond || Junk Bond Obs. || — || align=right | 2.7 km || 
|-id=258 bgcolor=#fefefe
| 214258 ||  || — || April 1, 2005 || Kitt Peak || Spacewatch || — || align=right | 2.9 km || 
|-id=259 bgcolor=#fefefe
| 214259 ||  || — || April 1, 2005 || Bergisch Gladbach || W. Bickel || MAS || align=right data-sort-value="0.93" | 930 m || 
|-id=260 bgcolor=#E9E9E9
| 214260 ||  || — || April 1, 2005 || Goodricke-Pigott || V. Reddy || — || align=right | 3.8 km || 
|-id=261 bgcolor=#E9E9E9
| 214261 ||  || — || April 1, 2005 || Anderson Mesa || LONEOS || MAR || align=right | 2.1 km || 
|-id=262 bgcolor=#fefefe
| 214262 ||  || — || April 2, 2005 || Kitt Peak || Spacewatch || ERI || align=right | 1.8 km || 
|-id=263 bgcolor=#fefefe
| 214263 ||  || — || April 2, 2005 || Mount Lemmon || Mount Lemmon Survey || V || align=right data-sort-value="0.81" | 810 m || 
|-id=264 bgcolor=#E9E9E9
| 214264 ||  || — || April 2, 2005 || Palomar || NEAT || — || align=right | 2.1 km || 
|-id=265 bgcolor=#E9E9E9
| 214265 ||  || — || April 4, 2005 || Socorro || LINEAR || — || align=right | 1.6 km || 
|-id=266 bgcolor=#fefefe
| 214266 ||  || — || April 4, 2005 || Catalina || CSS || — || align=right | 1.5 km || 
|-id=267 bgcolor=#E9E9E9
| 214267 ||  || — || April 4, 2005 || Socorro || LINEAR || — || align=right | 1.3 km || 
|-id=268 bgcolor=#E9E9E9
| 214268 ||  || — || April 4, 2005 || Mount Lemmon || Mount Lemmon Survey || — || align=right | 1.1 km || 
|-id=269 bgcolor=#fefefe
| 214269 ||  || — || April 5, 2005 || Anderson Mesa || LONEOS || V || align=right | 1.0 km || 
|-id=270 bgcolor=#E9E9E9
| 214270 ||  || — || April 5, 2005 || Catalina || CSS || — || align=right | 1.5 km || 
|-id=271 bgcolor=#E9E9E9
| 214271 ||  || — || April 2, 2005 || Mount Lemmon || Mount Lemmon Survey || — || align=right | 1.4 km || 
|-id=272 bgcolor=#E9E9E9
| 214272 ||  || — || April 2, 2005 || Mount Lemmon || Mount Lemmon Survey || EUN || align=right | 1.9 km || 
|-id=273 bgcolor=#E9E9E9
| 214273 ||  || — || April 2, 2005 || Mount Lemmon || Mount Lemmon Survey || — || align=right | 2.4 km || 
|-id=274 bgcolor=#E9E9E9
| 214274 ||  || — || April 6, 2005 || Mount Lemmon || Mount Lemmon Survey || — || align=right | 1.5 km || 
|-id=275 bgcolor=#fefefe
| 214275 ||  || — || April 2, 2005 || Catalina || CSS || — || align=right | 1.6 km || 
|-id=276 bgcolor=#fefefe
| 214276 ||  || — || April 2, 2005 || Catalina || CSS || — || align=right | 1.1 km || 
|-id=277 bgcolor=#E9E9E9
| 214277 ||  || — || April 2, 2005 || Mount Lemmon || Mount Lemmon Survey || — || align=right | 1.2 km || 
|-id=278 bgcolor=#E9E9E9
| 214278 ||  || — || April 2, 2005 || Mount Lemmon || Mount Lemmon Survey || — || align=right | 1.2 km || 
|-id=279 bgcolor=#fefefe
| 214279 ||  || — || April 5, 2005 || Mount Lemmon || Mount Lemmon Survey || — || align=right | 1.2 km || 
|-id=280 bgcolor=#fefefe
| 214280 ||  || — || April 5, 2005 || Mount Lemmon || Mount Lemmon Survey || — || align=right data-sort-value="0.98" | 980 m || 
|-id=281 bgcolor=#E9E9E9
| 214281 ||  || — || April 5, 2005 || Anderson Mesa || LONEOS || — || align=right | 2.1 km || 
|-id=282 bgcolor=#E9E9E9
| 214282 ||  || — || April 7, 2005 || Mount Lemmon || Mount Lemmon Survey || — || align=right | 1.3 km || 
|-id=283 bgcolor=#E9E9E9
| 214283 ||  || — || April 10, 2005 || Mount Lemmon || Mount Lemmon Survey || — || align=right | 1.2 km || 
|-id=284 bgcolor=#fefefe
| 214284 ||  || — || April 10, 2005 || Kitt Peak || Spacewatch || — || align=right | 1.1 km || 
|-id=285 bgcolor=#E9E9E9
| 214285 ||  || — || April 14, 2005 || Kitt Peak || Spacewatch || — || align=right | 2.0 km || 
|-id=286 bgcolor=#E9E9E9
| 214286 ||  || — || April 10, 2005 || Mount Lemmon || Mount Lemmon Survey || — || align=right | 1.1 km || 
|-id=287 bgcolor=#E9E9E9
| 214287 ||  || — || April 12, 2005 || Kitt Peak || Spacewatch || — || align=right | 2.2 km || 
|-id=288 bgcolor=#fefefe
| 214288 ||  || — || April 14, 2005 || Kitt Peak || Spacewatch || — || align=right | 1.2 km || 
|-id=289 bgcolor=#E9E9E9
| 214289 ||  || — || April 15, 2005 || Catalina || CSS || — || align=right | 3.3 km || 
|-id=290 bgcolor=#E9E9E9
| 214290 ||  || — || April 12, 2005 || Kitt Peak || M. W. Buie || — || align=right | 1.8 km || 
|-id=291 bgcolor=#d6d6d6
| 214291 ||  || — || April 6, 2005 || Catalina || CSS || ALA || align=right | 6.7 km || 
|-id=292 bgcolor=#fefefe
| 214292 ||  || — || April 1, 2005 || Anderson Mesa || LONEOS || NYS || align=right data-sort-value="0.90" | 900 m || 
|-id=293 bgcolor=#E9E9E9
| 214293 ||  || — || April 16, 2005 || Kitt Peak || Spacewatch || — || align=right | 1.0 km || 
|-id=294 bgcolor=#E9E9E9
| 214294 ||  || — || April 30, 2005 || Kitt Peak || Spacewatch || — || align=right | 1.3 km || 
|-id=295 bgcolor=#E9E9E9
| 214295 ||  || — || April 30, 2005 || Kitt Peak || Spacewatch || EUN || align=right | 1.3 km || 
|-id=296 bgcolor=#E9E9E9
| 214296 ||  || — || April 30, 2005 || Campo Imperatore || CINEOS || — || align=right | 2.3 km || 
|-id=297 bgcolor=#E9E9E9
| 214297 ||  || — || April 17, 2005 || Kitt Peak || Spacewatch || — || align=right | 1.5 km || 
|-id=298 bgcolor=#E9E9E9
| 214298 ||  || — || April 30, 2005 || Siding Spring || SSS || — || align=right | 5.0 km || 
|-id=299 bgcolor=#E9E9E9
| 214299 ||  || — || May 3, 2005 || Socorro || LINEAR || — || align=right | 1.7 km || 
|-id=300 bgcolor=#E9E9E9
| 214300 ||  || — || May 3, 2005 || Socorro || LINEAR || — || align=right | 1.5 km || 
|}

214301–214400 

|-bgcolor=#E9E9E9
| 214301 ||  || — || May 3, 2005 || Kitt Peak || Spacewatch || — || align=right | 1.2 km || 
|-id=302 bgcolor=#fefefe
| 214302 ||  || — || May 3, 2005 || Kitt Peak || Spacewatch || NYS || align=right data-sort-value="0.95" | 950 m || 
|-id=303 bgcolor=#E9E9E9
| 214303 ||  || — || May 1, 2005 || Palomar || NEAT || — || align=right | 2.6 km || 
|-id=304 bgcolor=#E9E9E9
| 214304 ||  || — || May 3, 2005 || Kitt Peak || Spacewatch || NEM || align=right | 3.2 km || 
|-id=305 bgcolor=#E9E9E9
| 214305 ||  || — || May 3, 2005 || Kitt Peak || Spacewatch || — || align=right | 1.1 km || 
|-id=306 bgcolor=#E9E9E9
| 214306 ||  || — || May 4, 2005 || Mount Lemmon || Mount Lemmon Survey || — || align=right | 2.7 km || 
|-id=307 bgcolor=#fefefe
| 214307 ||  || — || May 4, 2005 || Cordell-Lorenz || D. T. Durig || — || align=right | 1.6 km || 
|-id=308 bgcolor=#E9E9E9
| 214308 ||  || — || May 2, 2005 || Kitt Peak || Spacewatch || — || align=right | 1.3 km || 
|-id=309 bgcolor=#fefefe
| 214309 ||  || — || May 3, 2005 || Kitt Peak || Spacewatch || — || align=right | 1.5 km || 
|-id=310 bgcolor=#fefefe
| 214310 ||  || — || May 4, 2005 || Mount Lemmon || Mount Lemmon Survey || MAS || align=right | 1.1 km || 
|-id=311 bgcolor=#E9E9E9
| 214311 ||  || — || May 4, 2005 || Palomar || NEAT || — || align=right | 1.8 km || 
|-id=312 bgcolor=#E9E9E9
| 214312 ||  || — || May 4, 2005 || Palomar || NEAT || — || align=right | 1.5 km || 
|-id=313 bgcolor=#E9E9E9
| 214313 ||  || — || May 4, 2005 || Mount Lemmon || Mount Lemmon Survey || — || align=right | 1.6 km || 
|-id=314 bgcolor=#E9E9E9
| 214314 ||  || — || May 4, 2005 || Mount Lemmon || Mount Lemmon Survey || — || align=right | 2.2 km || 
|-id=315 bgcolor=#E9E9E9
| 214315 ||  || — || May 6, 2005 || Socorro || LINEAR || — || align=right | 3.1 km || 
|-id=316 bgcolor=#E9E9E9
| 214316 ||  || — || May 6, 2005 || Socorro || LINEAR || — || align=right | 2.6 km || 
|-id=317 bgcolor=#E9E9E9
| 214317 ||  || — || May 8, 2005 || Kitt Peak || Spacewatch || — || align=right | 2.9 km || 
|-id=318 bgcolor=#E9E9E9
| 214318 ||  || — || May 8, 2005 || Mount Lemmon || Mount Lemmon Survey || — || align=right | 1.9 km || 
|-id=319 bgcolor=#E9E9E9
| 214319 ||  || — || May 8, 2005 || Kitt Peak || Spacewatch || — || align=right | 1.4 km || 
|-id=320 bgcolor=#E9E9E9
| 214320 ||  || — || May 3, 2005 || Kitt Peak || Spacewatch || — || align=right | 1.4 km || 
|-id=321 bgcolor=#E9E9E9
| 214321 ||  || — || May 4, 2005 || Kitt Peak || Spacewatch || — || align=right | 1.4 km || 
|-id=322 bgcolor=#E9E9E9
| 214322 ||  || — || May 4, 2005 || Kitt Peak || Spacewatch || WIT || align=right | 1.2 km || 
|-id=323 bgcolor=#E9E9E9
| 214323 ||  || — || May 4, 2005 || Palomar || NEAT || — || align=right | 1.5 km || 
|-id=324 bgcolor=#E9E9E9
| 214324 ||  || — || May 6, 2005 || Kitt Peak || Spacewatch || EUN || align=right | 1.7 km || 
|-id=325 bgcolor=#E9E9E9
| 214325 ||  || — || May 8, 2005 || Siding Spring || SSS || — || align=right | 2.4 km || 
|-id=326 bgcolor=#E9E9E9
| 214326 ||  || — || May 4, 2005 || Mount Lemmon || Mount Lemmon Survey || — || align=right | 1.6 km || 
|-id=327 bgcolor=#E9E9E9
| 214327 ||  || — || May 4, 2005 || Palomar || NEAT || — || align=right | 1.8 km || 
|-id=328 bgcolor=#E9E9E9
| 214328 ||  || — || May 4, 2005 || Palomar || NEAT || EUN || align=right | 1.8 km || 
|-id=329 bgcolor=#E9E9E9
| 214329 ||  || — || May 7, 2005 || Kitt Peak || Spacewatch || AER || align=right | 3.8 km || 
|-id=330 bgcolor=#E9E9E9
| 214330 ||  || — || May 9, 2005 || Mount Lemmon || Mount Lemmon Survey || — || align=right | 1.7 km || 
|-id=331 bgcolor=#E9E9E9
| 214331 ||  || — || May 9, 2005 || Catalina || CSS || EUN || align=right | 1.7 km || 
|-id=332 bgcolor=#E9E9E9
| 214332 ||  || — || May 10, 2005 || Mount Lemmon || Mount Lemmon Survey || — || align=right | 1.3 km || 
|-id=333 bgcolor=#E9E9E9
| 214333 ||  || — || May 9, 2005 || Kitt Peak || Spacewatch || — || align=right | 1.4 km || 
|-id=334 bgcolor=#E9E9E9
| 214334 ||  || — || May 8, 2005 || Kitt Peak || Spacewatch || — || align=right | 1.2 km || 
|-id=335 bgcolor=#E9E9E9
| 214335 ||  || — || May 8, 2005 || Socorro || LINEAR || — || align=right | 3.8 km || 
|-id=336 bgcolor=#E9E9E9
| 214336 ||  || — || May 11, 2005 || Palomar || NEAT || ADE || align=right | 2.9 km || 
|-id=337 bgcolor=#E9E9E9
| 214337 ||  || — || May 11, 2005 || Palomar || NEAT || — || align=right | 1.3 km || 
|-id=338 bgcolor=#fefefe
| 214338 ||  || — || May 10, 2005 || Kitt Peak || Spacewatch || — || align=right | 1.2 km || 
|-id=339 bgcolor=#E9E9E9
| 214339 ||  || — || May 10, 2005 || Mount Lemmon || Mount Lemmon Survey || EUN || align=right | 1.7 km || 
|-id=340 bgcolor=#E9E9E9
| 214340 ||  || — || May 12, 2005 || Anderson Mesa || LONEOS || EUN || align=right | 2.3 km || 
|-id=341 bgcolor=#E9E9E9
| 214341 ||  || — || May 12, 2005 || Socorro || LINEAR || — || align=right | 3.6 km || 
|-id=342 bgcolor=#E9E9E9
| 214342 ||  || — || May 14, 2005 || Reedy Creek || J. Broughton || — || align=right | 1.3 km || 
|-id=343 bgcolor=#E9E9E9
| 214343 ||  || — || May 10, 2005 || Kitt Peak || Spacewatch || WIT || align=right | 1.4 km || 
|-id=344 bgcolor=#fefefe
| 214344 ||  || — || May 12, 2005 || Catalina || CSS || — || align=right | 1.1 km || 
|-id=345 bgcolor=#E9E9E9
| 214345 ||  || — || May 13, 2005 || Catalina || CSS || EUN || align=right | 1.8 km || 
|-id=346 bgcolor=#E9E9E9
| 214346 ||  || — || May 13, 2005 || Mount Lemmon || Mount Lemmon Survey || — || align=right | 1.3 km || 
|-id=347 bgcolor=#E9E9E9
| 214347 ||  || — || May 15, 2005 || Mount Lemmon || Mount Lemmon Survey || — || align=right | 1.3 km || 
|-id=348 bgcolor=#E9E9E9
| 214348 ||  || — || May 12, 2005 || Catalina || CSS || — || align=right | 1.9 km || 
|-id=349 bgcolor=#E9E9E9
| 214349 ||  || — || May 11, 2005 || Anderson Mesa || LONEOS || — || align=right | 1.7 km || 
|-id=350 bgcolor=#E9E9E9
| 214350 ||  || — || May 4, 2005 || Mount Lemmon || Mount Lemmon Survey || — || align=right | 1.8 km || 
|-id=351 bgcolor=#E9E9E9
| 214351 ||  || — || May 7, 2005 || Mount Lemmon || Mount Lemmon Survey || — || align=right | 1.2 km || 
|-id=352 bgcolor=#E9E9E9
| 214352 ||  || — || May 9, 2005 || Anderson Mesa || LONEOS || MAR || align=right | 1.8 km || 
|-id=353 bgcolor=#E9E9E9
| 214353 ||  || — || May 12, 2005 || Socorro || LINEAR || — || align=right | 1.7 km || 
|-id=354 bgcolor=#E9E9E9
| 214354 ||  || — || May 3, 2005 || Catalina || CSS || EUN || align=right | 1.6 km || 
|-id=355 bgcolor=#E9E9E9
| 214355 ||  || — || May 4, 2005 || Kitt Peak || Spacewatch || — || align=right | 1.3 km || 
|-id=356 bgcolor=#E9E9E9
| 214356 ||  || — || May 16, 2005 || Kitt Peak || Spacewatch || — || align=right | 1.0 km || 
|-id=357 bgcolor=#E9E9E9
| 214357 ||  || — || May 16, 2005 || Mount Lemmon || Mount Lemmon Survey || — || align=right | 2.2 km || 
|-id=358 bgcolor=#E9E9E9
| 214358 ||  || — || May 19, 2005 || Palomar || NEAT || — || align=right | 1.5 km || 
|-id=359 bgcolor=#E9E9E9
| 214359 ||  || — || May 20, 2005 || Mount Lemmon || Mount Lemmon Survey || WIT || align=right | 1.5 km || 
|-id=360 bgcolor=#E9E9E9
| 214360 ||  || — || May 20, 2005 || Mount Lemmon || Mount Lemmon Survey || — || align=right | 2.7 km || 
|-id=361 bgcolor=#E9E9E9
| 214361 ||  || — || May 27, 2005 || Campo Imperatore || CINEOS || — || align=right | 3.1 km || 
|-id=362 bgcolor=#E9E9E9
| 214362 ||  || — || May 30, 2005 || Reedy Creek || J. Broughton || — || align=right | 2.3 km || 
|-id=363 bgcolor=#E9E9E9
| 214363 ||  || — || May 16, 2005 || Mount Lemmon || Mount Lemmon Survey || — || align=right | 1.3 km || 
|-id=364 bgcolor=#E9E9E9
| 214364 ||  || — || June 1, 2005 || Mayhill || A. Lowe || — || align=right | 1.8 km || 
|-id=365 bgcolor=#E9E9E9
| 214365 ||  || — || June 2, 2005 || Catalina || CSS || — || align=right | 3.0 km || 
|-id=366 bgcolor=#E9E9E9
| 214366 ||  || — || June 2, 2005 || Catalina || CSS || MAR || align=right | 4.2 km || 
|-id=367 bgcolor=#E9E9E9
| 214367 ||  || — || June 3, 2005 || Siding Spring || SSS || — || align=right | 1.9 km || 
|-id=368 bgcolor=#E9E9E9
| 214368 ||  || — || June 1, 2005 || Mount Lemmon || Mount Lemmon Survey || — || align=right | 3.7 km || 
|-id=369 bgcolor=#E9E9E9
| 214369 ||  || — || June 3, 2005 || Catalina || CSS || MAR || align=right | 1.7 km || 
|-id=370 bgcolor=#E9E9E9
| 214370 ||  || — || June 4, 2005 || Catalina || CSS || — || align=right | 1.6 km || 
|-id=371 bgcolor=#E9E9E9
| 214371 ||  || — || June 4, 2005 || Kitt Peak || Spacewatch || — || align=right | 3.6 km || 
|-id=372 bgcolor=#E9E9E9
| 214372 ||  || — || June 4, 2005 || Socorro || LINEAR || — || align=right | 1.9 km || 
|-id=373 bgcolor=#E9E9E9
| 214373 ||  || — || June 5, 2005 || Kitt Peak || Spacewatch || — || align=right | 1.8 km || 
|-id=374 bgcolor=#E9E9E9
| 214374 ||  || — || June 1, 2005 || Kitt Peak || Spacewatch || AER || align=right | 3.4 km || 
|-id=375 bgcolor=#E9E9E9
| 214375 ||  || — || June 3, 2005 || Kitt Peak || Spacewatch || — || align=right | 1.4 km || 
|-id=376 bgcolor=#C2FFFF
| 214376 ||  || — || June 4, 2005 || Kitt Peak || Spacewatch || L4ERY || align=right | 13 km || 
|-id=377 bgcolor=#d6d6d6
| 214377 ||  || — || June 6, 2005 || Kitt Peak || Spacewatch || — || align=right | 4.3 km || 
|-id=378 bgcolor=#E9E9E9
| 214378 Kleinmann ||  ||  || June 10, 2005 || Vicques || M. Ory || KON || align=right | 4.3 km || 
|-id=379 bgcolor=#E9E9E9
| 214379 ||  || — || June 4, 2005 || Socorro || LINEAR || — || align=right | 1.3 km || 
|-id=380 bgcolor=#E9E9E9
| 214380 ||  || — || June 3, 2005 || Siding Spring || SSS || EUN || align=right | 2.0 km || 
|-id=381 bgcolor=#E9E9E9
| 214381 ||  || — || June 10, 2005 || Kitt Peak || Spacewatch || — || align=right | 4.0 km || 
|-id=382 bgcolor=#E9E9E9
| 214382 ||  || — || June 2, 2005 || Siding Spring || SSS || — || align=right | 1.4 km || 
|-id=383 bgcolor=#E9E9E9
| 214383 ||  || — || June 11, 2005 || Catalina || CSS || BRG || align=right | 2.8 km || 
|-id=384 bgcolor=#d6d6d6
| 214384 ||  || — || June 14, 2005 || Mount Lemmon || Mount Lemmon Survey || KOR || align=right | 1.9 km || 
|-id=385 bgcolor=#E9E9E9
| 214385 ||  || — || June 11, 2005 || Kitt Peak || Spacewatch || — || align=right | 1.6 km || 
|-id=386 bgcolor=#E9E9E9
| 214386 ||  || — || June 19, 2005 || Socorro || LINEAR || — || align=right | 4.9 km || 
|-id=387 bgcolor=#E9E9E9
| 214387 ||  || — || June 16, 2005 || Mount Lemmon || Mount Lemmon Survey || — || align=right | 2.0 km || 
|-id=388 bgcolor=#E9E9E9
| 214388 ||  || — || June 29, 2005 || Palomar || NEAT || — || align=right | 2.9 km || 
|-id=389 bgcolor=#fefefe
| 214389 ||  || — || June 27, 2005 || Kitt Peak || Spacewatch || MAS || align=right data-sort-value="0.93" | 930 m || 
|-id=390 bgcolor=#E9E9E9
| 214390 ||  || — || June 24, 2005 || Palomar || NEAT || — || align=right | 2.1 km || 
|-id=391 bgcolor=#d6d6d6
| 214391 ||  || — || June 29, 2005 || Kitt Peak || Spacewatch || — || align=right | 5.8 km || 
|-id=392 bgcolor=#d6d6d6
| 214392 ||  || — || June 30, 2005 || Kitt Peak || Spacewatch || KOR || align=right | 1.7 km || 
|-id=393 bgcolor=#d6d6d6
| 214393 ||  || — || June 30, 2005 || Kitt Peak || Spacewatch || — || align=right | 2.6 km || 
|-id=394 bgcolor=#E9E9E9
| 214394 ||  || — || July 2, 2005 || Kitt Peak || Spacewatch || — || align=right | 2.3 km || 
|-id=395 bgcolor=#E9E9E9
| 214395 ||  || — || July 4, 2005 || Palomar || NEAT || — || align=right | 3.8 km || 
|-id=396 bgcolor=#d6d6d6
| 214396 ||  || — || July 5, 2005 || Kitt Peak || Spacewatch || — || align=right | 3.1 km || 
|-id=397 bgcolor=#E9E9E9
| 214397 ||  || — || July 6, 2005 || Mayhill || J. Sue || MIT || align=right | 4.4 km || 
|-id=398 bgcolor=#fefefe
| 214398 ||  || — || July 6, 2005 || Reedy Creek || J. Broughton || — || align=right | 1.3 km || 
|-id=399 bgcolor=#d6d6d6
| 214399 ||  || — || July 1, 2005 || Kitt Peak || Spacewatch || — || align=right | 2.9 km || 
|-id=400 bgcolor=#d6d6d6
| 214400 ||  || — || July 7, 2005 || Kitt Peak || Spacewatch || — || align=right | 5.1 km || 
|}

214401–214500 

|-bgcolor=#d6d6d6
| 214401 ||  || — || July 10, 2005 || Kitt Peak || Spacewatch || EOS || align=right | 2.9 km || 
|-id=402 bgcolor=#d6d6d6
| 214402 ||  || — || July 10, 2005 || Kitt Peak || Spacewatch || — || align=right | 4.9 km || 
|-id=403 bgcolor=#E9E9E9
| 214403 ||  || — || July 6, 2005 || Kitt Peak || Spacewatch || MRX || align=right | 1.3 km || 
|-id=404 bgcolor=#E9E9E9
| 214404 ||  || — || July 3, 2005 || Palomar || NEAT || — || align=right | 2.4 km || 
|-id=405 bgcolor=#d6d6d6
| 214405 ||  || — || July 10, 2005 || Kitt Peak || Spacewatch || — || align=right | 3.7 km || 
|-id=406 bgcolor=#E9E9E9
| 214406 ||  || — || July 3, 2005 || Mount Lemmon || Mount Lemmon Survey || — || align=right | 3.0 km || 
|-id=407 bgcolor=#d6d6d6
| 214407 ||  || — || July 3, 2005 || Mount Lemmon || Mount Lemmon Survey || — || align=right | 3.6 km || 
|-id=408 bgcolor=#fefefe
| 214408 ||  || — || July 3, 2005 || Mount Lemmon || Mount Lemmon Survey || MAS || align=right data-sort-value="0.78" | 780 m || 
|-id=409 bgcolor=#d6d6d6
| 214409 ||  || — || July 4, 2005 || Kitt Peak || Spacewatch || KOR || align=right | 1.5 km || 
|-id=410 bgcolor=#E9E9E9
| 214410 ||  || — || July 27, 2005 || Reedy Creek || J. Broughton || WAT || align=right | 2.9 km || 
|-id=411 bgcolor=#E9E9E9
| 214411 ||  || — || July 26, 2005 || Palomar || NEAT || — || align=right | 3.4 km || 
|-id=412 bgcolor=#d6d6d6
| 214412 ||  || — || July 30, 2005 || Palomar || NEAT || — || align=right | 3.6 km || 
|-id=413 bgcolor=#d6d6d6
| 214413 ||  || — || July 30, 2005 || Palomar || NEAT || — || align=right | 4.3 km || 
|-id=414 bgcolor=#E9E9E9
| 214414 ||  || — || July 27, 2005 || Palomar || NEAT || MRX || align=right | 1.4 km || 
|-id=415 bgcolor=#E9E9E9
| 214415 ||  || — || July 29, 2005 || Palomar || NEAT || GEF || align=right | 1.6 km || 
|-id=416 bgcolor=#d6d6d6
| 214416 ||  || — || August 2, 2005 || Lake Tekapo || A. C. Gilmore || — || align=right | 3.5 km || 
|-id=417 bgcolor=#d6d6d6
| 214417 ||  || — || August 4, 2005 || Palomar || NEAT || URS || align=right | 4.7 km || 
|-id=418 bgcolor=#d6d6d6
| 214418 ||  || — || August 4, 2005 || Palomar || NEAT || — || align=right | 6.0 km || 
|-id=419 bgcolor=#d6d6d6
| 214419 ||  || — || August 4, 2005 || Palomar || NEAT || — || align=right | 3.5 km || 
|-id=420 bgcolor=#d6d6d6
| 214420 ||  || — || August 6, 2005 || Palomar || NEAT || EOS || align=right | 2.8 km || 
|-id=421 bgcolor=#fefefe
| 214421 ||  || — || August 24, 2005 || Palomar || NEAT || V || align=right | 1.0 km || 
|-id=422 bgcolor=#d6d6d6
| 214422 ||  || — || August 24, 2005 || Palomar || NEAT || TIR || align=right | 4.0 km || 
|-id=423 bgcolor=#d6d6d6
| 214423 ||  || — || August 27, 2005 || Junk Bond || D. Healy || — || align=right | 3.3 km || 
|-id=424 bgcolor=#d6d6d6
| 214424 ||  || — || August 25, 2005 || Palomar || NEAT || THM || align=right | 2.9 km || 
|-id=425 bgcolor=#d6d6d6
| 214425 ||  || — || August 25, 2005 || Palomar || NEAT || VER || align=right | 5.1 km || 
|-id=426 bgcolor=#d6d6d6
| 214426 ||  || — || August 25, 2005 || Palomar || NEAT || THM || align=right | 3.1 km || 
|-id=427 bgcolor=#d6d6d6
| 214427 ||  || — || August 27, 2005 || Kitt Peak || Spacewatch || HYG || align=right | 5.1 km || 
|-id=428 bgcolor=#d6d6d6
| 214428 ||  || — || August 27, 2005 || Kitt Peak || Spacewatch || — || align=right | 3.4 km || 
|-id=429 bgcolor=#d6d6d6
| 214429 ||  || — || August 26, 2005 || Anderson Mesa || LONEOS || — || align=right | 2.7 km || 
|-id=430 bgcolor=#d6d6d6
| 214430 ||  || — || August 28, 2005 || Kitt Peak || Spacewatch || — || align=right | 3.6 km || 
|-id=431 bgcolor=#d6d6d6
| 214431 ||  || — || August 28, 2005 || Kitt Peak || Spacewatch || THM || align=right | 3.2 km || 
|-id=432 bgcolor=#d6d6d6
| 214432 Belprahon ||  ||  || August 29, 2005 || Vicques || M. Ory || HYG || align=right | 3.5 km || 
|-id=433 bgcolor=#d6d6d6
| 214433 ||  || — || August 28, 2005 || Kitt Peak || Spacewatch || — || align=right | 4.1 km || 
|-id=434 bgcolor=#d6d6d6
| 214434 ||  || — || August 29, 2005 || Anderson Mesa || LONEOS || — || align=right | 5.3 km || 
|-id=435 bgcolor=#d6d6d6
| 214435 ||  || — || August 25, 2005 || Palomar || NEAT || EOS || align=right | 2.8 km || 
|-id=436 bgcolor=#d6d6d6
| 214436 ||  || — || August 29, 2005 || Anderson Mesa || LONEOS || — || align=right | 5.0 km || 
|-id=437 bgcolor=#d6d6d6
| 214437 ||  || — || August 27, 2005 || Palomar || NEAT || SYL7:4 || align=right | 6.8 km || 
|-id=438 bgcolor=#d6d6d6
| 214438 ||  || — || August 27, 2005 || Palomar || NEAT || — || align=right | 4.4 km || 
|-id=439 bgcolor=#d6d6d6
| 214439 ||  || — || August 28, 2005 || Kitt Peak || Spacewatch || VER || align=right | 3.5 km || 
|-id=440 bgcolor=#d6d6d6
| 214440 ||  || — || August 29, 2005 || Kitt Peak || Spacewatch || — || align=right | 2.9 km || 
|-id=441 bgcolor=#d6d6d6
| 214441 ||  || — || August 28, 2005 || Siding Spring || SSS || — || align=right | 2.9 km || 
|-id=442 bgcolor=#d6d6d6
| 214442 ||  || — || August 31, 2005 || Palomar || NEAT || EOS || align=right | 2.8 km || 
|-id=443 bgcolor=#d6d6d6
| 214443 ||  || — || August 30, 2005 || Kitt Peak || Spacewatch || HYG || align=right | 3.2 km || 
|-id=444 bgcolor=#d6d6d6
| 214444 ||  || — || September 4, 2005 || Bergisch Gladbach || W. Bickel || HYG || align=right | 3.5 km || 
|-id=445 bgcolor=#d6d6d6
| 214445 ||  || — || September 1, 2005 || Kitt Peak || Spacewatch || — || align=right | 5.2 km || 
|-id=446 bgcolor=#d6d6d6
| 214446 ||  || — || September 23, 2005 || Kitt Peak || Spacewatch || — || align=right | 7.6 km || 
|-id=447 bgcolor=#d6d6d6
| 214447 ||  || — || September 25, 2005 || Catalina || CSS || — || align=right | 6.8 km || 
|-id=448 bgcolor=#d6d6d6
| 214448 ||  || — || September 23, 2005 || Catalina || CSS || EOS || align=right | 3.6 km || 
|-id=449 bgcolor=#d6d6d6
| 214449 ||  || — || September 23, 2005 || Catalina || CSS || — || align=right | 4.5 km || 
|-id=450 bgcolor=#d6d6d6
| 214450 ||  || — || September 24, 2005 || Kitt Peak || Spacewatch || — || align=right | 3.6 km || 
|-id=451 bgcolor=#d6d6d6
| 214451 ||  || — || September 25, 2005 || Kitt Peak || Spacewatch || THM || align=right | 3.1 km || 
|-id=452 bgcolor=#d6d6d6
| 214452 ||  || — || September 27, 2005 || Palomar || NEAT || — || align=right | 5.7 km || 
|-id=453 bgcolor=#d6d6d6
| 214453 ||  || — || September 23, 2005 || Kitt Peak || Spacewatch || — || align=right | 6.3 km || 
|-id=454 bgcolor=#d6d6d6
| 214454 ||  || — || September 24, 2005 || Kitt Peak || Spacewatch || — || align=right | 2.9 km || 
|-id=455 bgcolor=#d6d6d6
| 214455 ||  || — || September 24, 2005 || Kitt Peak || Spacewatch || THM || align=right | 3.6 km || 
|-id=456 bgcolor=#d6d6d6
| 214456 ||  || — || September 24, 2005 || Kitt Peak || Spacewatch || THM || align=right | 2.8 km || 
|-id=457 bgcolor=#d6d6d6
| 214457 ||  || — || September 24, 2005 || Kitt Peak || Spacewatch || — || align=right | 5.4 km || 
|-id=458 bgcolor=#d6d6d6
| 214458 ||  || — || September 25, 2005 || Kitt Peak || Spacewatch || — || align=right | 2.9 km || 
|-id=459 bgcolor=#d6d6d6
| 214459 ||  || — || September 27, 2005 || Kitt Peak || Spacewatch || — || align=right | 4.2 km || 
|-id=460 bgcolor=#d6d6d6
| 214460 ||  || — || September 29, 2005 || Anderson Mesa || LONEOS || — || align=right | 5.2 km || 
|-id=461 bgcolor=#d6d6d6
| 214461 ||  || — || September 29, 2005 || Palomar || NEAT || — || align=right | 6.7 km || 
|-id=462 bgcolor=#d6d6d6
| 214462 ||  || — || September 29, 2005 || Kitt Peak || Spacewatch || MEL || align=right | 5.3 km || 
|-id=463 bgcolor=#d6d6d6
| 214463 ||  || — || September 25, 2005 || Kitt Peak || Spacewatch || THM || align=right | 3.1 km || 
|-id=464 bgcolor=#d6d6d6
| 214464 ||  || — || September 25, 2005 || Kitt Peak || Spacewatch || TIR || align=right | 4.1 km || 
|-id=465 bgcolor=#d6d6d6
| 214465 ||  || — || September 28, 2005 || Palomar || NEAT || — || align=right | 3.5 km || 
|-id=466 bgcolor=#d6d6d6
| 214466 ||  || — || September 29, 2005 || Kitt Peak || Spacewatch || — || align=right | 5.1 km || 
|-id=467 bgcolor=#d6d6d6
| 214467 ||  || — || September 30, 2005 || Kitt Peak || Spacewatch || — || align=right | 3.8 km || 
|-id=468 bgcolor=#d6d6d6
| 214468 ||  || — || September 30, 2005 || Mount Lemmon || Mount Lemmon Survey || — || align=right | 4.1 km || 
|-id=469 bgcolor=#d6d6d6
| 214469 ||  || — || September 30, 2005 || Mount Lemmon || Mount Lemmon Survey || — || align=right | 5.5 km || 
|-id=470 bgcolor=#d6d6d6
| 214470 ||  || — || September 27, 2005 || Socorro || LINEAR || LIX || align=right | 5.6 km || 
|-id=471 bgcolor=#d6d6d6
| 214471 ||  || — || September 23, 2005 || Kitt Peak || Spacewatch || — || align=right | 4.0 km || 
|-id=472 bgcolor=#d6d6d6
| 214472 ||  || — || September 22, 2005 || Apache Point || A. C. Becker || 3:2 || align=right | 5.7 km || 
|-id=473 bgcolor=#d6d6d6
| 214473 ||  || — || October 1, 2005 || Mount Lemmon || Mount Lemmon Survey || HYG || align=right | 5.0 km || 
|-id=474 bgcolor=#d6d6d6
| 214474 Long Island ||  ||  || October 1, 2005 || Catalina || CSS || HYG || align=right | 3.9 km || 
|-id=475 bgcolor=#d6d6d6
| 214475 Chrisbayus ||  ||  || October 3, 2005 || Catalina || CSS || — || align=right | 4.7 km || 
|-id=476 bgcolor=#d6d6d6
| 214476 Stephencolbert ||  ||  || October 3, 2005 || Catalina || CSS || VER || align=right | 4.8 km || 
|-id=477 bgcolor=#d6d6d6
| 214477 ||  || — || October 5, 2005 || Socorro || LINEAR || EUP || align=right | 6.0 km || 
|-id=478 bgcolor=#d6d6d6
| 214478 ||  || — || October 6, 2005 || Anderson Mesa || LONEOS || — || align=right | 3.3 km || 
|-id=479 bgcolor=#d6d6d6
| 214479 ||  || — || October 5, 2005 || Catalina || CSS || — || align=right | 6.8 km || 
|-id=480 bgcolor=#d6d6d6
| 214480 ||  || — || October 7, 2005 || Anderson Mesa || LONEOS || 7:4 || align=right | 6.8 km || 
|-id=481 bgcolor=#d6d6d6
| 214481 ||  || — || October 7, 2005 || Socorro || LINEAR || — || align=right | 2.9 km || 
|-id=482 bgcolor=#d6d6d6
| 214482 ||  || — || October 9, 2005 || Kitt Peak || Spacewatch || 7:4 || align=right | 4.8 km || 
|-id=483 bgcolor=#d6d6d6
| 214483 ||  || — || October 9, 2005 || Kitt Peak || Spacewatch || SHU3:2 || align=right | 8.9 km || 
|-id=484 bgcolor=#d6d6d6
| 214484 ||  || — || October 10, 2005 || Catalina || CSS || — || align=right | 4.9 km || 
|-id=485 bgcolor=#d6d6d6
| 214485 Dupouy ||  ||  || October 26, 2005 || Ottmarsheim || C. Rinner || — || align=right | 3.7 km || 
|-id=486 bgcolor=#d6d6d6
| 214486 ||  || — || October 21, 2005 || Palomar || NEAT || — || align=right | 4.1 km || 
|-id=487 bgcolor=#d6d6d6
| 214487 Baranivka ||  ||  || October 29, 2005 || Andrushivka || Andrushivka Obs. || HYG || align=right | 4.7 km || 
|-id=488 bgcolor=#d6d6d6
| 214488 ||  || — || October 22, 2005 || Catalina || CSS || — || align=right | 4.4 km || 
|-id=489 bgcolor=#fefefe
| 214489 ||  || — || October 22, 2005 || Palomar || NEAT || — || align=right | 2.1 km || 
|-id=490 bgcolor=#d6d6d6
| 214490 ||  || — || October 23, 2005 || Catalina || CSS || EUP || align=right | 5.1 km || 
|-id=491 bgcolor=#d6d6d6
| 214491 ||  || — || October 24, 2005 || Kitt Peak || Spacewatch || TIR || align=right | 4.0 km || 
|-id=492 bgcolor=#d6d6d6
| 214492 ||  || — || October 27, 2005 || Kitt Peak || Spacewatch || — || align=right | 3.6 km || 
|-id=493 bgcolor=#d6d6d6
| 214493 ||  || — || October 24, 2005 || Kitt Peak || Spacewatch || — || align=right | 5.3 km || 
|-id=494 bgcolor=#d6d6d6
| 214494 ||  || — || October 27, 2005 || Kitt Peak || Spacewatch || — || align=right | 3.4 km || 
|-id=495 bgcolor=#d6d6d6
| 214495 ||  || — || October 29, 2005 || Mount Lemmon || Mount Lemmon Survey || — || align=right | 4.1 km || 
|-id=496 bgcolor=#E9E9E9
| 214496 ||  || — || November 3, 2005 || Mount Lemmon || Mount Lemmon Survey || MRX || align=right | 1.5 km || 
|-id=497 bgcolor=#fefefe
| 214497 ||  || — || November 13, 2005 || Catalina || CSS || H || align=right data-sort-value="0.90" | 900 m || 
|-id=498 bgcolor=#d6d6d6
| 214498 ||  || — || November 19, 2005 || Palomar || NEAT || THB || align=right | 5.4 km || 
|-id=499 bgcolor=#d6d6d6
| 214499 ||  || — || November 25, 2005 || Mount Lemmon || Mount Lemmon Survey || — || align=right | 4.9 km || 
|-id=500 bgcolor=#d6d6d6
| 214500 ||  || — || November 29, 2005 || Palomar || NEAT || HYG || align=right | 4.3 km || 
|}

214501–214600 

|-bgcolor=#d6d6d6
| 214501 ||  || — || November 26, 2005 || Catalina || CSS || — || align=right | 4.8 km || 
|-id=502 bgcolor=#fefefe
| 214502 ||  || — || November 28, 2005 || Catalina || CSS || H || align=right data-sort-value="0.95" | 950 m || 
|-id=503 bgcolor=#fefefe
| 214503 ||  || — || December 4, 2005 || Kitt Peak || Spacewatch || — || align=right data-sort-value="0.86" | 860 m || 
|-id=504 bgcolor=#fefefe
| 214504 ||  || — || December 20, 2005 || Socorro || LINEAR || H || align=right | 1.0 km || 
|-id=505 bgcolor=#E9E9E9
| 214505 ||  || — || December 27, 2005 || Mount Lemmon || Mount Lemmon Survey || — || align=right | 1.4 km || 
|-id=506 bgcolor=#C2FFFF
| 214506 ||  || — || December 28, 2005 || Kitt Peak || Spacewatch || L5 || align=right | 9.2 km || 
|-id=507 bgcolor=#E9E9E9
| 214507 ||  || — || January 5, 2006 || Mount Lemmon || Mount Lemmon Survey || — || align=right | 2.3 km || 
|-id=508 bgcolor=#C2FFFF
| 214508 ||  || — || January 6, 2006 || Catalina || CSS || L5 || align=right | 17 km || 
|-id=509 bgcolor=#E9E9E9
| 214509 ||  || — || January 25, 2006 || Kitt Peak || Spacewatch || — || align=right | 2.0 km || 
|-id=510 bgcolor=#d6d6d6
| 214510 ||  || — || January 26, 2006 || Kitt Peak || Spacewatch || — || align=right | 3.2 km || 
|-id=511 bgcolor=#C2FFFF
| 214511 ||  || — || January 29, 2006 || Bergisch Gladbach || W. Bickel || L5 || align=right | 14 km || 
|-id=512 bgcolor=#fefefe
| 214512 ||  || — || January 31, 2006 || Kitt Peak || Spacewatch || NYS || align=right | 1.1 km || 
|-id=513 bgcolor=#d6d6d6
| 214513 ||  || — || February 1, 2006 || Kitt Peak || Spacewatch || EOS || align=right | 3.3 km || 
|-id=514 bgcolor=#C2FFFF
| 214514 ||  || — || February 20, 2006 || Kitt Peak || Spacewatch || L5 || align=right | 14 km || 
|-id=515 bgcolor=#d6d6d6
| 214515 ||  || — || February 28, 2006 || Mount Lemmon || Mount Lemmon Survey || KOR || align=right | 1.8 km || 
|-id=516 bgcolor=#E9E9E9
| 214516 ||  || — || March 5, 2006 || Kitt Peak || Spacewatch || — || align=right | 2.5 km || 
|-id=517 bgcolor=#d6d6d6
| 214517 ||  || — || March 22, 2006 || Catalina || CSS || — || align=right | 5.8 km || 
|-id=518 bgcolor=#E9E9E9
| 214518 ||  || — || April 7, 2006 || Kitt Peak || Spacewatch || — || align=right | 2.3 km || 
|-id=519 bgcolor=#fefefe
| 214519 ||  || — || April 20, 2006 || Kitt Peak || Spacewatch || — || align=right | 1.0 km || 
|-id=520 bgcolor=#fefefe
| 214520 ||  || — || April 26, 2006 || Kitt Peak || Spacewatch || — || align=right | 1.0 km || 
|-id=521 bgcolor=#fefefe
| 214521 ||  || — || April 29, 2006 || Kitt Peak || Spacewatch || FLO || align=right data-sort-value="0.85" | 850 m || 
|-id=522 bgcolor=#fefefe
| 214522 ||  || — || April 30, 2006 || Kitt Peak || Spacewatch || — || align=right data-sort-value="0.97" | 970 m || 
|-id=523 bgcolor=#fefefe
| 214523 ||  || — || May 2, 2006 || Kitt Peak || Spacewatch || — || align=right data-sort-value="0.81" | 810 m || 
|-id=524 bgcolor=#fefefe
| 214524 ||  || — || May 4, 2006 || Kitt Peak || Spacewatch || FLO || align=right | 1.4 km || 
|-id=525 bgcolor=#fefefe
| 214525 ||  || — || May 19, 2006 || Mount Lemmon || Mount Lemmon Survey || — || align=right data-sort-value="0.79" | 790 m || 
|-id=526 bgcolor=#fefefe
| 214526 ||  || — || May 19, 2006 || Mount Lemmon || Mount Lemmon Survey || — || align=right data-sort-value="0.71" | 710 m || 
|-id=527 bgcolor=#fefefe
| 214527 ||  || — || May 19, 2006 || Mount Lemmon || Mount Lemmon Survey || — || align=right | 1.2 km || 
|-id=528 bgcolor=#E9E9E9
| 214528 ||  || — || May 19, 2006 || Palomar || NEAT || — || align=right | 2.0 km || 
|-id=529 bgcolor=#FA8072
| 214529 ||  || — || May 20, 2006 || Mount Lemmon || Mount Lemmon Survey || — || align=right | 1.3 km || 
|-id=530 bgcolor=#fefefe
| 214530 ||  || — || May 21, 2006 || Kitt Peak || Spacewatch || — || align=right data-sort-value="0.80" | 800 m || 
|-id=531 bgcolor=#fefefe
| 214531 ||  || — || May 25, 2006 || Kitt Peak || Spacewatch || — || align=right | 1.1 km || 
|-id=532 bgcolor=#fefefe
| 214532 ||  || — || May 26, 2006 || Kitt Peak || Spacewatch || V || align=right data-sort-value="0.71" | 710 m || 
|-id=533 bgcolor=#fefefe
| 214533 ||  || — || June 10, 2006 || Palomar || NEAT || — || align=right | 1.1 km || 
|-id=534 bgcolor=#fefefe
| 214534 ||  || — || June 3, 2006 || Mount Lemmon || Mount Lemmon Survey || — || align=right | 1.0 km || 
|-id=535 bgcolor=#fefefe
| 214535 ||  || — || June 19, 2006 || Hibiscus || S. F. Hönig || FLO || align=right data-sort-value="0.93" | 930 m || 
|-id=536 bgcolor=#fefefe
| 214536 ||  || — || June 19, 2006 || Mount Lemmon || Mount Lemmon Survey || V || align=right | 1.2 km || 
|-id=537 bgcolor=#fefefe
| 214537 ||  || — || June 21, 2006 || Palomar || NEAT || NYS || align=right | 1.1 km || 
|-id=538 bgcolor=#fefefe
| 214538 ||  || — || July 21, 2006 || Palomar || NEAT || — || align=right | 1.3 km || 
|-id=539 bgcolor=#fefefe
| 214539 ||  || — || July 19, 2006 || Palomar || NEAT || NYS || align=right data-sort-value="0.87" | 870 m || 
|-id=540 bgcolor=#fefefe
| 214540 ||  || — || July 20, 2006 || Palomar || NEAT || — || align=right | 1.3 km || 
|-id=541 bgcolor=#fefefe
| 214541 ||  || — || July 20, 2006 || Palomar || NEAT || MAS || align=right | 1.0 km || 
|-id=542 bgcolor=#fefefe
| 214542 ||  || — || July 24, 2006 || Altschwendt || W. Ries || MAS || align=right data-sort-value="0.75" | 750 m || 
|-id=543 bgcolor=#fefefe
| 214543 ||  || — || July 18, 2006 || Socorro || LINEAR || NYS || align=right data-sort-value="0.90" | 900 m || 
|-id=544 bgcolor=#fefefe
| 214544 ||  || — || July 24, 2006 || Socorro || LINEAR || — || align=right | 1.3 km || 
|-id=545 bgcolor=#fefefe
| 214545 ||  || — || July 18, 2006 || Siding Spring || SSS || V || align=right | 1.1 km || 
|-id=546 bgcolor=#fefefe
| 214546 ||  || — || July 18, 2006 || Siding Spring || SSS || V || align=right | 1.0 km || 
|-id=547 bgcolor=#E9E9E9
| 214547 ||  || — || July 21, 2006 || Mount Lemmon || Mount Lemmon Survey || — || align=right data-sort-value="0.94" | 940 m || 
|-id=548 bgcolor=#fefefe
| 214548 ||  || — || August 12, 2006 || Palomar || NEAT || MAS || align=right | 1.1 km || 
|-id=549 bgcolor=#fefefe
| 214549 ||  || — || August 13, 2006 || Palomar || NEAT || MAS || align=right data-sort-value="0.97" | 970 m || 
|-id=550 bgcolor=#fefefe
| 214550 ||  || — || August 14, 2006 || Siding Spring || SSS || V || align=right data-sort-value="0.96" | 960 m || 
|-id=551 bgcolor=#d6d6d6
| 214551 ||  || — || August 15, 2006 || Palomar || NEAT || — || align=right | 3.7 km || 
|-id=552 bgcolor=#fefefe
| 214552 ||  || — || August 15, 2006 || Palomar || NEAT || — || align=right | 1.0 km || 
|-id=553 bgcolor=#fefefe
| 214553 ||  || — || August 15, 2006 || Palomar || NEAT || — || align=right | 1.3 km || 
|-id=554 bgcolor=#fefefe
| 214554 ||  || — || August 14, 2006 || Siding Spring || SSS || — || align=right | 1.0 km || 
|-id=555 bgcolor=#fefefe
| 214555 ||  || — || August 12, 2006 || Palomar || NEAT || — || align=right | 1.2 km || 
|-id=556 bgcolor=#fefefe
| 214556 ||  || — || August 12, 2006 || Palomar || NEAT || — || align=right | 1.0 km || 
|-id=557 bgcolor=#fefefe
| 214557 ||  || — || August 12, 2006 || Palomar || NEAT || V || align=right | 1.0 km || 
|-id=558 bgcolor=#E9E9E9
| 214558 ||  || — || August 18, 2006 || Piszkésteto || K. Sárneczky || JUN || align=right | 1.4 km || 
|-id=559 bgcolor=#fefefe
| 214559 ||  || — || August 17, 2006 || Palomar || NEAT || NYS || align=right | 1.8 km || 
|-id=560 bgcolor=#d6d6d6
| 214560 ||  || — || August 19, 2006 || Kitt Peak || Spacewatch || VER || align=right | 4.3 km || 
|-id=561 bgcolor=#fefefe
| 214561 ||  || — || August 18, 2006 || Reedy Creek || J. Broughton || — || align=right | 1.5 km || 
|-id=562 bgcolor=#E9E9E9
| 214562 ||  || — || August 19, 2006 || Kitt Peak || Spacewatch || AGN || align=right | 1.9 km || 
|-id=563 bgcolor=#E9E9E9
| 214563 ||  || — || August 20, 2006 || Kitt Peak || Spacewatch || HEN || align=right | 1.4 km || 
|-id=564 bgcolor=#fefefe
| 214564 ||  || — || August 16, 2006 || Siding Spring || SSS || ERI || align=right | 1.9 km || 
|-id=565 bgcolor=#fefefe
| 214565 ||  || — || August 16, 2006 || Siding Spring || SSS || — || align=right data-sort-value="0.92" | 920 m || 
|-id=566 bgcolor=#d6d6d6
| 214566 ||  || — || August 17, 2006 || Palomar || NEAT || MEL || align=right | 4.9 km || 
|-id=567 bgcolor=#fefefe
| 214567 ||  || — || August 17, 2006 || Palomar || NEAT || — || align=right | 2.1 km || 
|-id=568 bgcolor=#fefefe
| 214568 ||  || — || August 19, 2006 || Anderson Mesa || LONEOS || — || align=right | 1.9 km || 
|-id=569 bgcolor=#E9E9E9
| 214569 ||  || — || August 19, 2006 || Kitt Peak || Spacewatch || — || align=right | 3.8 km || 
|-id=570 bgcolor=#E9E9E9
| 214570 ||  || — || August 21, 2006 || Socorro || LINEAR || MAR || align=right | 1.7 km || 
|-id=571 bgcolor=#fefefe
| 214571 ||  || — || August 17, 2006 || Palomar || NEAT || MAS || align=right data-sort-value="0.86" | 860 m || 
|-id=572 bgcolor=#fefefe
| 214572 ||  || — || August 16, 2006 || Siding Spring || SSS || NYS || align=right data-sort-value="0.97" | 970 m || 
|-id=573 bgcolor=#E9E9E9
| 214573 ||  || — || August 17, 2006 || Socorro || LINEAR || JUN || align=right | 1.6 km || 
|-id=574 bgcolor=#fefefe
| 214574 ||  || — || August 18, 2006 || Anderson Mesa || LONEOS || — || align=right | 1.0 km || 
|-id=575 bgcolor=#fefefe
| 214575 ||  || — || August 17, 2006 || Palomar || NEAT || — || align=right | 1.2 km || 
|-id=576 bgcolor=#fefefe
| 214576 ||  || — || August 19, 2006 || Kitt Peak || Spacewatch || NYS || align=right data-sort-value="0.88" | 880 m || 
|-id=577 bgcolor=#fefefe
| 214577 ||  || — || August 19, 2006 || Kitt Peak || Spacewatch || MAS || align=right data-sort-value="0.90" | 900 m || 
|-id=578 bgcolor=#fefefe
| 214578 ||  || — || August 19, 2006 || Palomar || NEAT || V || align=right | 1.2 km || 
|-id=579 bgcolor=#fefefe
| 214579 ||  || — || August 21, 2006 || Kitt Peak || Spacewatch || — || align=right | 1.1 km || 
|-id=580 bgcolor=#d6d6d6
| 214580 ||  || — || August 22, 2006 || Palomar || NEAT || — || align=right | 4.3 km || 
|-id=581 bgcolor=#fefefe
| 214581 ||  || — || August 23, 2006 || Socorro || LINEAR || MAS || align=right | 1.1 km || 
|-id=582 bgcolor=#fefefe
| 214582 ||  || — || August 23, 2006 || Palomar || NEAT || — || align=right | 1.5 km || 
|-id=583 bgcolor=#fefefe
| 214583 ||  || — || August 23, 2006 || Palomar || NEAT || — || align=right | 1.7 km || 
|-id=584 bgcolor=#E9E9E9
| 214584 ||  || — || August 21, 2006 || Socorro || LINEAR || — || align=right | 2.3 km || 
|-id=585 bgcolor=#fefefe
| 214585 ||  || — || August 23, 2006 || Socorro || LINEAR || NYS || align=right data-sort-value="0.94" | 940 m || 
|-id=586 bgcolor=#d6d6d6
| 214586 ||  || — || August 21, 2006 || Kitt Peak || Spacewatch || — || align=right | 2.6 km || 
|-id=587 bgcolor=#E9E9E9
| 214587 ||  || — || August 21, 2006 || Kitt Peak || Spacewatch || — || align=right | 1.6 km || 
|-id=588 bgcolor=#E9E9E9
| 214588 ||  || — || August 24, 2006 || Palomar || NEAT || — || align=right | 3.1 km || 
|-id=589 bgcolor=#fefefe
| 214589 ||  || — || August 25, 2006 || Socorro || LINEAR || NYS || align=right data-sort-value="0.86" | 860 m || 
|-id=590 bgcolor=#d6d6d6
| 214590 ||  || — || August 27, 2006 || Kitt Peak || Spacewatch || KOR || align=right | 2.0 km || 
|-id=591 bgcolor=#E9E9E9
| 214591 ||  || — || August 28, 2006 || Anderson Mesa || LONEOS || — || align=right | 2.1 km || 
|-id=592 bgcolor=#E9E9E9
| 214592 ||  || — || August 16, 2006 || Palomar || NEAT || GEF || align=right | 1.7 km || 
|-id=593 bgcolor=#fefefe
| 214593 ||  || — || August 21, 2006 || Palomar || NEAT || — || align=right | 1.2 km || 
|-id=594 bgcolor=#E9E9E9
| 214594 ||  || — || August 23, 2006 || Palomar || NEAT || MAR || align=right | 1.6 km || 
|-id=595 bgcolor=#fefefe
| 214595 ||  || — || August 28, 2006 || Socorro || LINEAR || — || align=right | 1.8 km || 
|-id=596 bgcolor=#fefefe
| 214596 ||  || — || August 18, 2006 || Kitt Peak || Spacewatch || MAS || align=right | 1.0 km || 
|-id=597 bgcolor=#E9E9E9
| 214597 ||  || — || August 18, 2006 || Kitt Peak || Spacewatch || — || align=right | 2.5 km || 
|-id=598 bgcolor=#fefefe
| 214598 ||  || — || August 18, 2006 || Kitt Peak || Spacewatch || — || align=right | 1.2 km || 
|-id=599 bgcolor=#E9E9E9
| 214599 ||  || — || August 19, 2006 || Kitt Peak || Spacewatch || GEF || align=right | 1.3 km || 
|-id=600 bgcolor=#E9E9E9
| 214600 ||  || — || August 21, 2006 || Kitt Peak || Spacewatch || — || align=right | 1.7 km || 
|}

214601–214700 

|-bgcolor=#E9E9E9
| 214601 ||  || — || August 29, 2006 || Catalina || CSS || WIT || align=right | 1.5 km || 
|-id=602 bgcolor=#E9E9E9
| 214602 ||  || — || August 30, 2006 || Anderson Mesa || LONEOS || — || align=right | 3.5 km || 
|-id=603 bgcolor=#E9E9E9
| 214603 ||  || — || August 28, 2006 || Anderson Mesa || LONEOS || PAD || align=right | 4.0 km || 
|-id=604 bgcolor=#fefefe
| 214604 ||  || — || September 14, 2006 || Catalina || CSS || — || align=right | 1.2 km || 
|-id=605 bgcolor=#E9E9E9
| 214605 ||  || — || September 12, 2006 || Catalina || CSS || MAR || align=right | 1.6 km || 
|-id=606 bgcolor=#E9E9E9
| 214606 ||  || — || September 14, 2006 || Catalina || CSS || — || align=right | 2.7 km || 
|-id=607 bgcolor=#FA8072
| 214607 ||  || — || September 15, 2006 || Palomar || NEAT || — || align=right | 1.7 km || 
|-id=608 bgcolor=#E9E9E9
| 214608 ||  || — || September 12, 2006 || Socorro || LINEAR || — || align=right | 4.5 km || 
|-id=609 bgcolor=#fefefe
| 214609 ||  || — || September 14, 2006 || Catalina || CSS || — || align=right | 1.2 km || 
|-id=610 bgcolor=#E9E9E9
| 214610 ||  || — || September 12, 2006 || Catalina || CSS || — || align=right | 2.9 km || 
|-id=611 bgcolor=#E9E9E9
| 214611 ||  || — || September 14, 2006 || Palomar || NEAT || — || align=right | 2.7 km || 
|-id=612 bgcolor=#E9E9E9
| 214612 ||  || — || September 12, 2006 || Catalina || CSS || — || align=right | 3.2 km || 
|-id=613 bgcolor=#fefefe
| 214613 ||  || — || September 14, 2006 || Catalina || CSS || NYS || align=right data-sort-value="0.94" | 940 m || 
|-id=614 bgcolor=#E9E9E9
| 214614 ||  || — || September 14, 2006 || Kitt Peak || Spacewatch || — || align=right | 1.0 km || 
|-id=615 bgcolor=#d6d6d6
| 214615 ||  || — || September 14, 2006 || Kitt Peak || Spacewatch || EOS || align=right | 2.6 km || 
|-id=616 bgcolor=#E9E9E9
| 214616 ||  || — || September 14, 2006 || Kitt Peak || Spacewatch || — || align=right | 3.7 km || 
|-id=617 bgcolor=#d6d6d6
| 214617 ||  || — || September 14, 2006 || Kitt Peak || Spacewatch || — || align=right | 2.4 km || 
|-id=618 bgcolor=#E9E9E9
| 214618 ||  || — || September 15, 2006 || Kitt Peak || Spacewatch || HOF || align=right | 3.2 km || 
|-id=619 bgcolor=#E9E9E9
| 214619 ||  || — || September 14, 2006 || Palomar || NEAT || HEN || align=right | 1.6 km || 
|-id=620 bgcolor=#fefefe
| 214620 ||  || — || September 14, 2006 || Palomar || NEAT || — || align=right | 1.4 km || 
|-id=621 bgcolor=#E9E9E9
| 214621 ||  || — || September 15, 2006 || Kitt Peak || Spacewatch || AST || align=right | 3.0 km || 
|-id=622 bgcolor=#E9E9E9
| 214622 ||  || — || September 15, 2006 || Kitt Peak || Spacewatch || AST || align=right | 3.1 km || 
|-id=623 bgcolor=#E9E9E9
| 214623 ||  || — || September 15, 2006 || Kitt Peak || Spacewatch || HEN || align=right | 1.4 km || 
|-id=624 bgcolor=#E9E9E9
| 214624 ||  || — || September 15, 2006 || Kitt Peak || Spacewatch || — || align=right | 1.3 km || 
|-id=625 bgcolor=#E9E9E9
| 214625 ||  || — || September 15, 2006 || Kitt Peak || Spacewatch || — || align=right | 1.7 km || 
|-id=626 bgcolor=#fefefe
| 214626 ||  || — || September 15, 2006 || Kitt Peak || Spacewatch || — || align=right | 1.1 km || 
|-id=627 bgcolor=#E9E9E9
| 214627 ||  || — || September 15, 2006 || Kitt Peak || Spacewatch || — || align=right | 3.1 km || 
|-id=628 bgcolor=#E9E9E9
| 214628 ||  || — || September 15, 2006 || Kitt Peak || Spacewatch || — || align=right | 2.6 km || 
|-id=629 bgcolor=#d6d6d6
| 214629 ||  || — || September 14, 2006 || Catalina || CSS || BRA || align=right | 2.0 km || 
|-id=630 bgcolor=#E9E9E9
| 214630 ||  || — || September 14, 2006 || Catalina || CSS || AST || align=right | 2.2 km || 
|-id=631 bgcolor=#d6d6d6
| 214631 ||  || — || September 15, 2006 || Kitt Peak || Spacewatch || — || align=right | 4.7 km || 
|-id=632 bgcolor=#fefefe
| 214632 ||  || — || September 14, 2006 || Catalina || CSS || FLO || align=right data-sort-value="0.95" | 950 m || 
|-id=633 bgcolor=#fefefe
| 214633 ||  || — || September 14, 2006 || Kitt Peak || Spacewatch || NYS || align=right data-sort-value="0.79" | 790 m || 
|-id=634 bgcolor=#E9E9E9
| 214634 ||  || — || September 16, 2006 || Catalina || CSS || EUN || align=right | 2.9 km || 
|-id=635 bgcolor=#E9E9E9
| 214635 ||  || — || September 16, 2006 || Palomar || NEAT || PAD || align=right | 3.9 km || 
|-id=636 bgcolor=#d6d6d6
| 214636 ||  || — || September 16, 2006 || Catalina || CSS || — || align=right | 7.2 km || 
|-id=637 bgcolor=#E9E9E9
| 214637 ||  || — || September 17, 2006 || Kitt Peak || Spacewatch || — || align=right | 2.2 km || 
|-id=638 bgcolor=#d6d6d6
| 214638 ||  || — || September 19, 2006 || OAM || OAM Obs. || HYG || align=right | 4.3 km || 
|-id=639 bgcolor=#E9E9E9
| 214639 ||  || — || September 18, 2006 || Catalina || CSS || — || align=right | 3.1 km || 
|-id=640 bgcolor=#E9E9E9
| 214640 ||  || — || September 18, 2006 || Kitt Peak || Spacewatch || AST || align=right | 3.1 km || 
|-id=641 bgcolor=#E9E9E9
| 214641 ||  || — || September 18, 2006 || Catalina || CSS || — || align=right | 4.1 km || 
|-id=642 bgcolor=#d6d6d6
| 214642 ||  || — || September 18, 2006 || Kitt Peak || Spacewatch || — || align=right | 3.8 km || 
|-id=643 bgcolor=#d6d6d6
| 214643 ||  || — || September 18, 2006 || Calvin-Rehoboth || Calvin–Rehoboth Obs. || — || align=right | 2.7 km || 
|-id=644 bgcolor=#E9E9E9
| 214644 ||  || — || September 18, 2006 || Catalina || CSS || — || align=right | 3.2 km || 
|-id=645 bgcolor=#d6d6d6
| 214645 ||  || — || September 18, 2006 || Catalina || CSS || — || align=right | 3.6 km || 
|-id=646 bgcolor=#d6d6d6
| 214646 ||  || — || September 19, 2006 || Kitt Peak || Spacewatch || THM || align=right | 2.8 km || 
|-id=647 bgcolor=#d6d6d6
| 214647 ||  || — || September 19, 2006 || Kitt Peak || Spacewatch || — || align=right | 2.9 km || 
|-id=648 bgcolor=#E9E9E9
| 214648 ||  || — || September 19, 2006 || Kitt Peak || Spacewatch || — || align=right | 2.6 km || 
|-id=649 bgcolor=#E9E9E9
| 214649 ||  || — || September 19, 2006 || Kitt Peak || Spacewatch || NEM || align=right | 2.9 km || 
|-id=650 bgcolor=#d6d6d6
| 214650 ||  || — || September 19, 2006 || Kitt Peak || Spacewatch || HYG || align=right | 2.8 km || 
|-id=651 bgcolor=#d6d6d6
| 214651 ||  || — || September 19, 2006 || Kitt Peak || Spacewatch || EOS || align=right | 2.6 km || 
|-id=652 bgcolor=#d6d6d6
| 214652 ||  || — || September 19, 2006 || Kitt Peak || Spacewatch || — || align=right | 3.5 km || 
|-id=653 bgcolor=#E9E9E9
| 214653 ||  || — || September 20, 2006 || Anderson Mesa || LONEOS || — || align=right | 3.0 km || 
|-id=654 bgcolor=#E9E9E9
| 214654 ||  || — || September 18, 2006 || Kitt Peak || Spacewatch || — || align=right | 1.1 km || 
|-id=655 bgcolor=#E9E9E9
| 214655 ||  || — || September 18, 2006 || Kitt Peak || Spacewatch || — || align=right | 2.7 km || 
|-id=656 bgcolor=#E9E9E9
| 214656 ||  || — || September 18, 2006 || Kitt Peak || Spacewatch || — || align=right | 1.7 km || 
|-id=657 bgcolor=#fefefe
| 214657 ||  || — || September 19, 2006 || Catalina || CSS || NYS || align=right data-sort-value="0.88" | 880 m || 
|-id=658 bgcolor=#d6d6d6
| 214658 ||  || — || September 19, 2006 || Catalina || CSS || — || align=right | 3.6 km || 
|-id=659 bgcolor=#E9E9E9
| 214659 ||  || — || September 19, 2006 || Kitt Peak || Spacewatch || — || align=right | 2.4 km || 
|-id=660 bgcolor=#fefefe
| 214660 ||  || — || September 20, 2006 || Haleakala || NEAT || — || align=right | 1.7 km || 
|-id=661 bgcolor=#E9E9E9
| 214661 ||  || — || September 22, 2006 || Socorro || LINEAR || — || align=right | 2.2 km || 
|-id=662 bgcolor=#E9E9E9
| 214662 ||  || — || September 24, 2006 || Kitt Peak || Spacewatch || — || align=right | 3.8 km || 
|-id=663 bgcolor=#E9E9E9
| 214663 ||  || — || September 18, 2006 || Catalina || CSS || — || align=right | 3.5 km || 
|-id=664 bgcolor=#E9E9E9
| 214664 ||  || — || September 19, 2006 || Anderson Mesa || LONEOS || ADE || align=right | 3.6 km || 
|-id=665 bgcolor=#E9E9E9
| 214665 ||  || — || September 17, 2006 || Anderson Mesa || LONEOS || NEM || align=right | 3.3 km || 
|-id=666 bgcolor=#E9E9E9
| 214666 ||  || — || September 20, 2006 || Anderson Mesa || LONEOS || — || align=right | 2.1 km || 
|-id=667 bgcolor=#d6d6d6
| 214667 ||  || — || September 20, 2006 || Catalina || CSS || MEL || align=right | 4.7 km || 
|-id=668 bgcolor=#E9E9E9
| 214668 ||  || — || September 19, 2006 || Catalina || CSS || NEM || align=right | 3.2 km || 
|-id=669 bgcolor=#d6d6d6
| 214669 ||  || — || September 19, 2006 || Kitt Peak || Spacewatch || TIR || align=right | 3.2 km || 
|-id=670 bgcolor=#d6d6d6
| 214670 ||  || — || September 23, 2006 || Kitt Peak || Spacewatch || — || align=right | 7.3 km || 
|-id=671 bgcolor=#E9E9E9
| 214671 ||  || — || September 23, 2006 || Kitt Peak || Spacewatch || AST || align=right | 3.5 km || 
|-id=672 bgcolor=#E9E9E9
| 214672 ||  || — || September 25, 2006 || Anderson Mesa || LONEOS || — || align=right | 2.6 km || 
|-id=673 bgcolor=#E9E9E9
| 214673 ||  || — || September 25, 2006 || Kitt Peak || Spacewatch || AGN || align=right | 1.4 km || 
|-id=674 bgcolor=#d6d6d6
| 214674 ||  || — || September 25, 2006 || Mount Lemmon || Mount Lemmon Survey || — || align=right | 3.9 km || 
|-id=675 bgcolor=#E9E9E9
| 214675 ||  || — || September 26, 2006 || Kitt Peak || Spacewatch || HNA || align=right | 2.0 km || 
|-id=676 bgcolor=#E9E9E9
| 214676 ||  || — || September 26, 2006 || Kitt Peak || Spacewatch || AGN || align=right | 1.7 km || 
|-id=677 bgcolor=#E9E9E9
| 214677 ||  || — || September 26, 2006 || Mount Lemmon || Mount Lemmon Survey || — || align=right | 3.1 km || 
|-id=678 bgcolor=#E9E9E9
| 214678 ||  || — || September 25, 2006 || Moletai || Molėtai Obs. || WIT || align=right | 1.5 km || 
|-id=679 bgcolor=#d6d6d6
| 214679 ||  || — || September 24, 2006 || Kitt Peak || Spacewatch || KOR || align=right | 1.4 km || 
|-id=680 bgcolor=#d6d6d6
| 214680 ||  || — || September 25, 2006 || Kitt Peak || Spacewatch || — || align=right | 3.0 km || 
|-id=681 bgcolor=#E9E9E9
| 214681 ||  || — || September 25, 2006 || Kitt Peak || Spacewatch || — || align=right | 3.1 km || 
|-id=682 bgcolor=#d6d6d6
| 214682 ||  || — || September 26, 2006 || Catalina || CSS || NAE || align=right | 5.2 km || 
|-id=683 bgcolor=#E9E9E9
| 214683 ||  || — || September 26, 2006 || Mount Lemmon || Mount Lemmon Survey || AGN || align=right | 1.6 km || 
|-id=684 bgcolor=#E9E9E9
| 214684 ||  || — || September 27, 2006 || Kitt Peak || Spacewatch || — || align=right | 1.6 km || 
|-id=685 bgcolor=#d6d6d6
| 214685 ||  || — || September 28, 2006 || Kitt Peak || Spacewatch || — || align=right | 2.9 km || 
|-id=686 bgcolor=#d6d6d6
| 214686 ||  || — || September 26, 2006 || Kitt Peak || Spacewatch || — || align=right | 2.6 km || 
|-id=687 bgcolor=#d6d6d6
| 214687 ||  || — || September 26, 2006 || Kitt Peak || Spacewatch || — || align=right | 3.2 km || 
|-id=688 bgcolor=#fefefe
| 214688 ||  || — || September 26, 2006 || Mount Lemmon || Mount Lemmon Survey || — || align=right data-sort-value="0.94" | 940 m || 
|-id=689 bgcolor=#E9E9E9
| 214689 ||  || — || September 26, 2006 || Mount Lemmon || Mount Lemmon Survey || AGN || align=right | 1.7 km || 
|-id=690 bgcolor=#E9E9E9
| 214690 ||  || — || September 26, 2006 || Mount Lemmon || Mount Lemmon Survey || — || align=right | 3.4 km || 
|-id=691 bgcolor=#E9E9E9
| 214691 ||  || — || September 26, 2006 || Mount Lemmon || Mount Lemmon Survey || — || align=right | 1.9 km || 
|-id=692 bgcolor=#d6d6d6
| 214692 ||  || — || September 28, 2006 || Kitt Peak || Spacewatch || — || align=right | 3.5 km || 
|-id=693 bgcolor=#E9E9E9
| 214693 ||  || — || September 25, 2006 || Pla D'Arguines || R. Ferrando || — || align=right | 2.4 km || 
|-id=694 bgcolor=#E9E9E9
| 214694 ||  || — || September 29, 2006 || Anderson Mesa || LONEOS || — || align=right | 3.0 km || 
|-id=695 bgcolor=#E9E9E9
| 214695 ||  || — || September 25, 2006 || Kitt Peak || Spacewatch || — || align=right | 3.1 km || 
|-id=696 bgcolor=#E9E9E9
| 214696 ||  || — || September 25, 2006 || Kitt Peak || Spacewatch || PAD || align=right | 2.7 km || 
|-id=697 bgcolor=#E9E9E9
| 214697 ||  || — || September 25, 2006 || Kitt Peak || Spacewatch || — || align=right | 1.0 km || 
|-id=698 bgcolor=#E9E9E9
| 214698 ||  || — || September 27, 2006 || Mount Lemmon || Mount Lemmon Survey || — || align=right | 1.8 km || 
|-id=699 bgcolor=#d6d6d6
| 214699 ||  || — || September 27, 2006 || Kitt Peak || Spacewatch || URS || align=right | 3.9 km || 
|-id=700 bgcolor=#E9E9E9
| 214700 ||  || — || September 28, 2006 || Kitt Peak || Spacewatch || HOF || align=right | 3.9 km || 
|}

214701–214800 

|-bgcolor=#E9E9E9
| 214701 ||  || — || September 28, 2006 || Kitt Peak || Spacewatch || GEF || align=right | 2.2 km || 
|-id=702 bgcolor=#E9E9E9
| 214702 ||  || — || September 28, 2006 || Kitt Peak || Spacewatch || AGN || align=right | 1.5 km || 
|-id=703 bgcolor=#d6d6d6
| 214703 ||  || — || September 28, 2006 || Kitt Peak || Spacewatch || — || align=right | 4.3 km || 
|-id=704 bgcolor=#E9E9E9
| 214704 ||  || — || September 28, 2006 || Kitt Peak || Spacewatch || — || align=right | 1.9 km || 
|-id=705 bgcolor=#E9E9E9
| 214705 ||  || — || September 30, 2006 || Catalina || CSS || — || align=right | 3.3 km || 
|-id=706 bgcolor=#E9E9E9
| 214706 ||  || — || September 30, 2006 || Catalina || CSS || — || align=right | 1.9 km || 
|-id=707 bgcolor=#d6d6d6
| 214707 ||  || — || September 29, 2006 || Apache Point || A. C. Becker || LIX || align=right | 4.2 km || 
|-id=708 bgcolor=#d6d6d6
| 214708 ||  || — || September 30, 2006 || Apache Point || A. C. Becker || EOS || align=right | 3.0 km || 
|-id=709 bgcolor=#E9E9E9
| 214709 ||  || — || September 30, 2006 || Apache Point || A. C. Becker || ADE || align=right | 2.6 km || 
|-id=710 bgcolor=#d6d6d6
| 214710 ||  || — || September 26, 2006 || Catalina || CSS || — || align=right | 3.6 km || 
|-id=711 bgcolor=#fefefe
| 214711 ||  || — || September 30, 2006 || Catalina || CSS || — || align=right | 1.2 km || 
|-id=712 bgcolor=#d6d6d6
| 214712 ||  || — || September 26, 2006 || Kitt Peak || Spacewatch || KOR || align=right | 1.4 km || 
|-id=713 bgcolor=#E9E9E9
| 214713 ||  || — || September 20, 2006 || Socorro || LINEAR || — || align=right | 2.3 km || 
|-id=714 bgcolor=#E9E9E9
| 214714 ||  || — || October 2, 2006 || Mayhill || A. Lowe || — || align=right | 3.1 km || 
|-id=715 bgcolor=#d6d6d6
| 214715 Silvanofuso ||  ||  || October 10, 2006 || San Marcello || L. Tesi, G. Fagioli || EOS || align=right | 2.8 km || 
|-id=716 bgcolor=#d6d6d6
| 214716 ||  || — || October 13, 2006 || Desert Moon || B. L. Stevens || — || align=right | 4.4 km || 
|-id=717 bgcolor=#d6d6d6
| 214717 ||  || — || October 4, 2006 || Mount Lemmon || Mount Lemmon Survey || EUP || align=right | 6.4 km || 
|-id=718 bgcolor=#E9E9E9
| 214718 ||  || — || October 4, 2006 || Mount Lemmon || Mount Lemmon Survey || — || align=right | 2.2 km || 
|-id=719 bgcolor=#d6d6d6
| 214719 ||  || — || October 13, 2006 || Dax || Dax Obs. || URS || align=right | 5.2 km || 
|-id=720 bgcolor=#E9E9E9
| 214720 ||  || — || October 2, 2006 || Kitt Peak || Spacewatch || — || align=right | 2.9 km || 
|-id=721 bgcolor=#d6d6d6
| 214721 ||  || — || October 10, 2006 || Palomar || NEAT || — || align=right | 3.5 km || 
|-id=722 bgcolor=#d6d6d6
| 214722 ||  || — || October 11, 2006 || Kitt Peak || Spacewatch || — || align=right | 2.9 km || 
|-id=723 bgcolor=#E9E9E9
| 214723 ||  || — || October 11, 2006 || Kitt Peak || Spacewatch || — || align=right | 3.3 km || 
|-id=724 bgcolor=#d6d6d6
| 214724 ||  || — || October 11, 2006 || Kitt Peak || Spacewatch || — || align=right | 3.1 km || 
|-id=725 bgcolor=#d6d6d6
| 214725 ||  || — || October 11, 2006 || Kitt Peak || Spacewatch || — || align=right | 3.9 km || 
|-id=726 bgcolor=#E9E9E9
| 214726 ||  || — || October 11, 2006 || Kitt Peak || Spacewatch || — || align=right | 3.1 km || 
|-id=727 bgcolor=#d6d6d6
| 214727 ||  || — || October 11, 2006 || Kitt Peak || Spacewatch || KOR || align=right | 1.7 km || 
|-id=728 bgcolor=#E9E9E9
| 214728 ||  || — || October 11, 2006 || Kitt Peak || Spacewatch || WIT || align=right | 1.5 km || 
|-id=729 bgcolor=#E9E9E9
| 214729 ||  || — || October 12, 2006 || Kitt Peak || Spacewatch || — || align=right | 1.4 km || 
|-id=730 bgcolor=#d6d6d6
| 214730 ||  || — || October 12, 2006 || Kitt Peak || Spacewatch || — || align=right | 3.9 km || 
|-id=731 bgcolor=#d6d6d6
| 214731 ||  || — || October 12, 2006 || Kitt Peak || Spacewatch || EOS || align=right | 2.6 km || 
|-id=732 bgcolor=#d6d6d6
| 214732 ||  || — || October 12, 2006 || Kitt Peak || Spacewatch || HYG || align=right | 3.2 km || 
|-id=733 bgcolor=#d6d6d6
| 214733 ||  || — || October 12, 2006 || Kitt Peak || Spacewatch || — || align=right | 5.2 km || 
|-id=734 bgcolor=#d6d6d6
| 214734 ||  || — || October 12, 2006 || Kitt Peak || Spacewatch || — || align=right | 3.3 km || 
|-id=735 bgcolor=#d6d6d6
| 214735 ||  || — || October 12, 2006 || Kitt Peak || Spacewatch || — || align=right | 2.8 km || 
|-id=736 bgcolor=#E9E9E9
| 214736 ||  || — || October 12, 2006 || Kitt Peak || Spacewatch || — || align=right | 1.6 km || 
|-id=737 bgcolor=#d6d6d6
| 214737 ||  || — || October 12, 2006 || Kitt Peak || Spacewatch || — || align=right | 2.8 km || 
|-id=738 bgcolor=#d6d6d6
| 214738 ||  || — || October 12, 2006 || Kitt Peak || Spacewatch || — || align=right | 3.1 km || 
|-id=739 bgcolor=#d6d6d6
| 214739 ||  || — || October 12, 2006 || Kitt Peak || Spacewatch || — || align=right | 3.3 km || 
|-id=740 bgcolor=#d6d6d6
| 214740 ||  || — || October 12, 2006 || Kitt Peak || Spacewatch || — || align=right | 3.9 km || 
|-id=741 bgcolor=#d6d6d6
| 214741 ||  || — || October 12, 2006 || Kitt Peak || Spacewatch || — || align=right | 3.7 km || 
|-id=742 bgcolor=#d6d6d6
| 214742 ||  || — || October 12, 2006 || Kitt Peak || Spacewatch || EOS || align=right | 2.2 km || 
|-id=743 bgcolor=#d6d6d6
| 214743 ||  || — || October 12, 2006 || Kitt Peak || Spacewatch || — || align=right | 4.8 km || 
|-id=744 bgcolor=#d6d6d6
| 214744 ||  || — || October 12, 2006 || Kitt Peak || Spacewatch || — || align=right | 2.9 km || 
|-id=745 bgcolor=#E9E9E9
| 214745 ||  || — || October 12, 2006 || Palomar || NEAT || — || align=right | 2.3 km || 
|-id=746 bgcolor=#d6d6d6
| 214746 ||  || — || October 14, 2006 || Lulin Observatory || C.-S. Lin, Q.-z. Ye || — || align=right | 3.4 km || 
|-id=747 bgcolor=#E9E9E9
| 214747 ||  || — || October 15, 2006 || Catalina || CSS || — || align=right | 2.2 km || 
|-id=748 bgcolor=#d6d6d6
| 214748 ||  || — || October 13, 2006 || Kitt Peak || Spacewatch || HYG || align=right | 3.9 km || 
|-id=749 bgcolor=#d6d6d6
| 214749 ||  || — || October 13, 2006 || Kitt Peak || Spacewatch || — || align=right | 4.1 km || 
|-id=750 bgcolor=#d6d6d6
| 214750 ||  || — || October 11, 2006 || Kitt Peak || Spacewatch || — || align=right | 5.1 km || 
|-id=751 bgcolor=#d6d6d6
| 214751 ||  || — || October 11, 2006 || Palomar || NEAT || — || align=right | 4.4 km || 
|-id=752 bgcolor=#E9E9E9
| 214752 ||  || — || October 11, 2006 || Palomar || NEAT || — || align=right | 3.0 km || 
|-id=753 bgcolor=#E9E9E9
| 214753 ||  || — || October 11, 2006 || Palomar || NEAT || — || align=right | 1.1 km || 
|-id=754 bgcolor=#E9E9E9
| 214754 ||  || — || October 11, 2006 || Palomar || NEAT || — || align=right | 3.0 km || 
|-id=755 bgcolor=#d6d6d6
| 214755 ||  || — || October 12, 2006 || Palomar || NEAT || — || align=right | 4.2 km || 
|-id=756 bgcolor=#d6d6d6
| 214756 ||  || — || October 13, 2006 || Kitt Peak || Spacewatch || EOS || align=right | 2.7 km || 
|-id=757 bgcolor=#d6d6d6
| 214757 ||  || — || October 13, 2006 || Kitt Peak || Spacewatch || — || align=right | 4.2 km || 
|-id=758 bgcolor=#d6d6d6
| 214758 ||  || — || October 15, 2006 || Kitt Peak || Spacewatch || — || align=right | 4.3 km || 
|-id=759 bgcolor=#d6d6d6
| 214759 ||  || — || October 13, 2006 || Lulin Observatory || C.-S. Lin, Q.-z. Ye || EOS || align=right | 2.5 km || 
|-id=760 bgcolor=#E9E9E9
| 214760 ||  || — || October 15, 2006 || Kitt Peak || Spacewatch || AGN || align=right | 1.3 km || 
|-id=761 bgcolor=#d6d6d6
| 214761 ||  || — || October 15, 2006 || Kitt Peak || Spacewatch || — || align=right | 3.5 km || 
|-id=762 bgcolor=#E9E9E9
| 214762 ||  || — || October 11, 2006 || Apache Point || A. C. Becker || GEF || align=right | 1.6 km || 
|-id=763 bgcolor=#d6d6d6
| 214763 ||  || — || October 12, 2006 || Kitt Peak || Spacewatch || — || align=right | 2.9 km || 
|-id=764 bgcolor=#d6d6d6
| 214764 ||  || — || October 12, 2006 || Apache Point || A. C. Becker || — || align=right | 4.4 km || 
|-id=765 bgcolor=#E9E9E9
| 214765 ||  || — || October 16, 2006 || Catalina || CSS || — || align=right | 2.2 km || 
|-id=766 bgcolor=#E9E9E9
| 214766 ||  || — || October 16, 2006 || Catalina || CSS || — || align=right | 1.5 km || 
|-id=767 bgcolor=#d6d6d6
| 214767 ||  || — || October 16, 2006 || Kitt Peak || Spacewatch || — || align=right | 4.1 km || 
|-id=768 bgcolor=#E9E9E9
| 214768 ||  || — || October 17, 2006 || Mount Lemmon || Mount Lemmon Survey || MRX || align=right | 2.1 km || 
|-id=769 bgcolor=#d6d6d6
| 214769 ||  || — || October 16, 2006 || Kitt Peak || Spacewatch || — || align=right | 3.9 km || 
|-id=770 bgcolor=#d6d6d6
| 214770 ||  || — || October 19, 2006 || Catalina || CSS || — || align=right | 4.5 km || 
|-id=771 bgcolor=#d6d6d6
| 214771 ||  || — || October 20, 2006 || Kitt Peak || Spacewatch || — || align=right | 3.4 km || 
|-id=772 bgcolor=#d6d6d6
| 214772 UNICEF ||  ||  || October 23, 2006 || Vallemare di Borbona || V. S. Casulli || — || align=right | 3.4 km || 
|-id=773 bgcolor=#E9E9E9
| 214773 ||  || — || October 22, 2006 || Goodricke-Pigott || R. A. Tucker || INO || align=right | 1.6 km || 
|-id=774 bgcolor=#E9E9E9
| 214774 ||  || — || October 16, 2006 || Catalina || CSS || — || align=right | 3.4 km || 
|-id=775 bgcolor=#d6d6d6
| 214775 ||  || — || October 16, 2006 || Bergisch Gladbach || W. Bickel || — || align=right | 2.8 km || 
|-id=776 bgcolor=#E9E9E9
| 214776 ||  || — || October 17, 2006 || Catalina || CSS || — || align=right | 3.0 km || 
|-id=777 bgcolor=#d6d6d6
| 214777 ||  || — || October 17, 2006 || Mount Lemmon || Mount Lemmon Survey || — || align=right | 2.6 km || 
|-id=778 bgcolor=#E9E9E9
| 214778 ||  || — || October 17, 2006 || Mount Lemmon || Mount Lemmon Survey || — || align=right | 1.9 km || 
|-id=779 bgcolor=#d6d6d6
| 214779 ||  || — || October 17, 2006 || Mount Lemmon || Mount Lemmon Survey || — || align=right | 3.1 km || 
|-id=780 bgcolor=#d6d6d6
| 214780 ||  || — || October 17, 2006 || Mount Lemmon || Mount Lemmon Survey || KOR || align=right | 2.2 km || 
|-id=781 bgcolor=#d6d6d6
| 214781 ||  || — || October 17, 2006 || Mount Lemmon || Mount Lemmon Survey || CRO || align=right | 4.5 km || 
|-id=782 bgcolor=#d6d6d6
| 214782 ||  || — || October 17, 2006 || Mount Lemmon || Spacewatch || — || align=right | 4.9 km || 
|-id=783 bgcolor=#d6d6d6
| 214783 ||  || — || October 18, 2006 || Kitt Peak || Spacewatch || — || align=right | 3.4 km || 
|-id=784 bgcolor=#fefefe
| 214784 ||  || — || October 18, 2006 || Kitt Peak || Spacewatch || V || align=right data-sort-value="0.80" | 800 m || 
|-id=785 bgcolor=#d6d6d6
| 214785 ||  || — || October 19, 2006 || Kitt Peak || Spacewatch || — || align=right | 3.2 km || 
|-id=786 bgcolor=#E9E9E9
| 214786 ||  || — || October 19, 2006 || Kitt Peak || Spacewatch || — || align=right | 3.4 km || 
|-id=787 bgcolor=#E9E9E9
| 214787 ||  || — || October 19, 2006 || Kitt Peak || Spacewatch || RAF || align=right | 3.7 km || 
|-id=788 bgcolor=#d6d6d6
| 214788 ||  || — || October 19, 2006 || Kitt Peak || Spacewatch || — || align=right | 2.7 km || 
|-id=789 bgcolor=#fefefe
| 214789 ||  || — || October 19, 2006 || Mount Lemmon || Mount Lemmon Survey || FLO || align=right data-sort-value="0.97" | 970 m || 
|-id=790 bgcolor=#d6d6d6
| 214790 ||  || — || October 21, 2006 || Mount Lemmon || Mount Lemmon Survey || KOR || align=right | 1.7 km || 
|-id=791 bgcolor=#E9E9E9
| 214791 ||  || — || October 16, 2006 || Catalina || CSS || — || align=right | 2.5 km || 
|-id=792 bgcolor=#E9E9E9
| 214792 ||  || — || October 16, 2006 || Catalina || CSS || — || align=right | 4.0 km || 
|-id=793 bgcolor=#d6d6d6
| 214793 ||  || — || October 16, 2006 || Catalina || CSS || — || align=right | 4.7 km || 
|-id=794 bgcolor=#d6d6d6
| 214794 ||  || — || October 16, 2006 || Catalina || CSS || — || align=right | 4.6 km || 
|-id=795 bgcolor=#E9E9E9
| 214795 ||  || — || October 16, 2006 || Catalina || CSS || — || align=right | 1.8 km || 
|-id=796 bgcolor=#E9E9E9
| 214796 ||  || — || October 16, 2006 || Catalina || CSS || — || align=right | 2.7 km || 
|-id=797 bgcolor=#E9E9E9
| 214797 ||  || — || October 16, 2006 || Catalina || CSS || — || align=right | 1.9 km || 
|-id=798 bgcolor=#d6d6d6
| 214798 ||  || — || October 19, 2006 || Catalina || CSS || TIR || align=right | 5.6 km || 
|-id=799 bgcolor=#d6d6d6
| 214799 ||  || — || October 20, 2006 || Kitt Peak || Spacewatch || — || align=right | 3.4 km || 
|-id=800 bgcolor=#E9E9E9
| 214800 ||  || — || October 22, 2006 || Catalina || CSS || WIT || align=right | 1.4 km || 
|}

214801–214900 

|-bgcolor=#E9E9E9
| 214801 ||  || — || October 22, 2006 || Palomar || NEAT || EUN || align=right | 2.2 km || 
|-id=802 bgcolor=#d6d6d6
| 214802 ||  || — || October 22, 2006 || Palomar || NEAT || EOS || align=right | 3.0 km || 
|-id=803 bgcolor=#E9E9E9
| 214803 ||  || — || October 23, 2006 || Kitt Peak || Spacewatch || — || align=right | 2.4 km || 
|-id=804 bgcolor=#d6d6d6
| 214804 ||  || — || October 23, 2006 || Kitt Peak || Spacewatch || — || align=right | 3.8 km || 
|-id=805 bgcolor=#d6d6d6
| 214805 ||  || — || October 16, 2006 || Catalina || CSS || ALA || align=right | 7.3 km || 
|-id=806 bgcolor=#d6d6d6
| 214806 ||  || — || October 17, 2006 || Mount Lemmon || Mount Lemmon Survey || CHA || align=right | 2.7 km || 
|-id=807 bgcolor=#d6d6d6
| 214807 ||  || — || October 20, 2006 || Kitt Peak || Spacewatch || EOS || align=right | 2.7 km || 
|-id=808 bgcolor=#E9E9E9
| 214808 ||  || — || October 20, 2006 || Mount Lemmon || Mount Lemmon Survey || — || align=right | 1.6 km || 
|-id=809 bgcolor=#E9E9E9
| 214809 ||  || — || October 20, 2006 || Palomar || NEAT || — || align=right | 3.0 km || 
|-id=810 bgcolor=#E9E9E9
| 214810 ||  || — || October 21, 2006 || Palomar || NEAT || — || align=right | 3.2 km || 
|-id=811 bgcolor=#E9E9E9
| 214811 ||  || — || October 22, 2006 || Mount Lemmon || Mount Lemmon Survey || — || align=right | 2.4 km || 
|-id=812 bgcolor=#d6d6d6
| 214812 ||  || — || October 27, 2006 || Kitt Peak || Spacewatch || — || align=right | 3.0 km || 
|-id=813 bgcolor=#d6d6d6
| 214813 ||  || — || October 28, 2006 || Mount Lemmon || Mount Lemmon Survey || — || align=right | 3.6 km || 
|-id=814 bgcolor=#d6d6d6
| 214814 ||  || — || October 28, 2006 || Mount Lemmon || Mount Lemmon Survey || EOS || align=right | 2.8 km || 
|-id=815 bgcolor=#d6d6d6
| 214815 ||  || — || October 28, 2006 || Mount Lemmon || Mount Lemmon Survey || — || align=right | 2.9 km || 
|-id=816 bgcolor=#E9E9E9
| 214816 ||  || — || October 29, 2006 || Kitt Peak || Spacewatch || — || align=right | 2.9 km || 
|-id=817 bgcolor=#d6d6d6
| 214817 ||  || — || October 17, 2006 || Catalina || CSS || — || align=right | 3.6 km || 
|-id=818 bgcolor=#E9E9E9
| 214818 ||  || — || October 21, 2006 || Apache Point || A. C. Becker || — || align=right | 2.6 km || 
|-id=819 bgcolor=#d6d6d6
| 214819 Gianotti ||  ||  || November 10, 2006 || Vallemare Borbona || V. S. Casulli || — || align=right | 4.7 km || 
|-id=820 bgcolor=#E9E9E9
| 214820 Faustocoppi ||  ||  || November 14, 2006 || Vallemare Borbona || V. S. Casulli || — || align=right | 3.1 km || 
|-id=821 bgcolor=#d6d6d6
| 214821 ||  || — || November 9, 2006 || Kitt Peak || Spacewatch || EOS || align=right | 2.6 km || 
|-id=822 bgcolor=#d6d6d6
| 214822 ||  || — || November 9, 2006 || Kitt Peak || Spacewatch || — || align=right | 3.3 km || 
|-id=823 bgcolor=#E9E9E9
| 214823 ||  || — || November 10, 2006 || Kitt Peak || Spacewatch || — || align=right | 3.4 km || 
|-id=824 bgcolor=#d6d6d6
| 214824 ||  || — || November 11, 2006 || Mount Lemmon || Mount Lemmon Survey || — || align=right | 3.5 km || 
|-id=825 bgcolor=#d6d6d6
| 214825 ||  || — || November 12, 2006 || Mount Lemmon || Mount Lemmon Survey || — || align=right | 3.8 km || 
|-id=826 bgcolor=#d6d6d6
| 214826 ||  || — || November 10, 2006 || Kitt Peak || Spacewatch || — || align=right | 3.0 km || 
|-id=827 bgcolor=#E9E9E9
| 214827 ||  || — || November 11, 2006 || Mount Lemmon || Mount Lemmon Survey || — || align=right | 1.4 km || 
|-id=828 bgcolor=#d6d6d6
| 214828 ||  || — || November 11, 2006 || Kitt Peak || Spacewatch || — || align=right | 4.6 km || 
|-id=829 bgcolor=#d6d6d6
| 214829 ||  || — || November 12, 2006 || Mount Lemmon || Mount Lemmon Survey || HYG || align=right | 4.7 km || 
|-id=830 bgcolor=#d6d6d6
| 214830 ||  || — || November 12, 2006 || Mount Lemmon || Mount Lemmon Survey || — || align=right | 5.2 km || 
|-id=831 bgcolor=#fefefe
| 214831 ||  || — || November 15, 2006 || Mount Lemmon || Mount Lemmon Survey || FLO || align=right data-sort-value="0.70" | 700 m || 
|-id=832 bgcolor=#d6d6d6
| 214832 ||  || — || November 15, 2006 || Mount Lemmon || Mount Lemmon Survey || — || align=right | 4.6 km || 
|-id=833 bgcolor=#d6d6d6
| 214833 ||  || — || November 13, 2006 || Catalina || CSS || VER || align=right | 4.1 km || 
|-id=834 bgcolor=#d6d6d6
| 214834 ||  || — || November 13, 2006 || Catalina || CSS || EOS || align=right | 2.8 km || 
|-id=835 bgcolor=#d6d6d6
| 214835 ||  || — || November 14, 2006 || Kitt Peak || Spacewatch || K-2 || align=right | 1.8 km || 
|-id=836 bgcolor=#E9E9E9
| 214836 ||  || — || November 15, 2006 || Kitt Peak || Spacewatch || — || align=right | 2.3 km || 
|-id=837 bgcolor=#d6d6d6
| 214837 ||  || — || November 15, 2006 || Kitt Peak || Spacewatch || — || align=right | 5.4 km || 
|-id=838 bgcolor=#d6d6d6
| 214838 ||  || — || November 15, 2006 || Mount Lemmon || Mount Lemmon Survey || KOR || align=right | 1.8 km || 
|-id=839 bgcolor=#E9E9E9
| 214839 ||  || — || November 13, 2006 || Mount Lemmon || Mount Lemmon Survey || DOR || align=right | 3.3 km || 
|-id=840 bgcolor=#d6d6d6
| 214840 ||  || — || November 15, 2006 || Catalina || CSS || — || align=right | 5.4 km || 
|-id=841 bgcolor=#d6d6d6
| 214841 ||  || — || November 15, 2006 || Catalina || CSS || — || align=right | 5.5 km || 
|-id=842 bgcolor=#d6d6d6
| 214842 ||  || — || November 9, 2006 || Palomar || NEAT || — || align=right | 3.9 km || 
|-id=843 bgcolor=#d6d6d6
| 214843 ||  || — || November 11, 2006 || Kitt Peak || Spacewatch || THM || align=right | 3.8 km || 
|-id=844 bgcolor=#E9E9E9
| 214844 ||  || — || November 16, 2006 || Mount Lemmon || Mount Lemmon Survey || HOF || align=right | 3.6 km || 
|-id=845 bgcolor=#d6d6d6
| 214845 ||  || — || November 17, 2006 || Mount Lemmon || Mount Lemmon Survey || ANF || align=right | 1.7 km || 
|-id=846 bgcolor=#d6d6d6
| 214846 ||  || — || November 18, 2006 || Kitt Peak || Spacewatch || HYG || align=right | 3.9 km || 
|-id=847 bgcolor=#fefefe
| 214847 ||  || — || November 19, 2006 || Kitt Peak || Spacewatch || — || align=right | 1.2 km || 
|-id=848 bgcolor=#d6d6d6
| 214848 ||  || — || November 19, 2006 || Kitt Peak || Spacewatch || — || align=right | 3.2 km || 
|-id=849 bgcolor=#d6d6d6
| 214849 ||  || — || November 19, 2006 || Kitt Peak || Spacewatch || — || align=right | 2.7 km || 
|-id=850 bgcolor=#fefefe
| 214850 ||  || — || November 19, 2006 || Socorro || LINEAR || — || align=right | 1.0 km || 
|-id=851 bgcolor=#E9E9E9
| 214851 ||  || — || November 19, 2006 || Catalina || CSS || MRX || align=right | 1.3 km || 
|-id=852 bgcolor=#d6d6d6
| 214852 ||  || — || November 19, 2006 || Kitt Peak || Spacewatch || HYG || align=right | 3.3 km || 
|-id=853 bgcolor=#d6d6d6
| 214853 ||  || — || November 19, 2006 || Kitt Peak || Spacewatch || — || align=right | 3.6 km || 
|-id=854 bgcolor=#d6d6d6
| 214854 ||  || — || November 29, 2006 || Desert Moon || B. L. Stevens || — || align=right | 3.5 km || 
|-id=855 bgcolor=#d6d6d6
| 214855 ||  || — || November 16, 2006 || Kitt Peak || Spacewatch || — || align=right | 5.6 km || 
|-id=856 bgcolor=#d6d6d6
| 214856 ||  || — || December 12, 2006 || Kitt Peak || Spacewatch || — || align=right | 3.8 km || 
|-id=857 bgcolor=#E9E9E9
| 214857 ||  || — || December 14, 2006 || Kitt Peak || Spacewatch || — || align=right | 1.1 km || 
|-id=858 bgcolor=#d6d6d6
| 214858 ||  || — || December 9, 2006 || Palomar || NEAT || — || align=right | 4.1 km || 
|-id=859 bgcolor=#E9E9E9
| 214859 ||  || — || December 20, 2006 || Palomar || NEAT || — || align=right | 1.5 km || 
|-id=860 bgcolor=#d6d6d6
| 214860 ||  || — || December 20, 2006 || Nyukasa || Mount Nyukasa Stn. || EOS || align=right | 4.2 km || 
|-id=861 bgcolor=#d6d6d6
| 214861 ||  || — || December 21, 2006 || Kitt Peak || Spacewatch || — || align=right | 3.7 km || 
|-id=862 bgcolor=#d6d6d6
| 214862 ||  || — || December 22, 2006 || Kitt Peak || Spacewatch || — || align=right | 4.2 km || 
|-id=863 bgcolor=#E9E9E9
| 214863 Seiradakis ||  ||  || December 27, 2006 || Mount Lemmon || Mount Lemmon Survey || HOF || align=right | 2.9 km || 
|-id=864 bgcolor=#fefefe
| 214864 ||  || — || March 6, 2007 || Palomar || NEAT || V || align=right data-sort-value="0.98" | 980 m || 
|-id=865 bgcolor=#fefefe
| 214865 ||  || — || March 14, 2007 || Mount Lemmon || Mount Lemmon Survey || H || align=right data-sort-value="0.88" | 880 m || 
|-id=866 bgcolor=#E9E9E9
| 214866 ||  || — || March 14, 2007 || Catalina || CSS || — || align=right | 4.7 km || 
|-id=867 bgcolor=#d6d6d6
| 214867 ||  || — || April 16, 2007 || Catalina || CSS || — || align=right | 4.1 km || 
|-id=868 bgcolor=#fefefe
| 214868 ||  || — || August 5, 2007 || Socorro || LINEAR || — || align=right data-sort-value="0.88" | 880 m || 
|-id=869 bgcolor=#FFC2E0
| 214869 ||  || — || August 9, 2007 || Socorro || LINEAR || APO +1kmPHAslow || align=right | 1.9 km || 
|-id=870 bgcolor=#fefefe
| 214870 ||  || — || August 8, 2007 || Socorro || LINEAR || — || align=right | 1.2 km || 
|-id=871 bgcolor=#fefefe
| 214871 ||  || — || August 9, 2007 || Socorro || LINEAR || ERI || align=right | 2.6 km || 
|-id=872 bgcolor=#fefefe
| 214872 ||  || — || August 21, 2007 || Anderson Mesa || LONEOS || — || align=right data-sort-value="0.94" | 940 m || 
|-id=873 bgcolor=#fefefe
| 214873 ||  || — || September 2, 2007 || Mount Lemmon || Mount Lemmon Survey || H || align=right data-sort-value="0.72" | 720 m || 
|-id=874 bgcolor=#d6d6d6
| 214874 ||  || — || September 9, 2007 || Anderson Mesa || LONEOS || — || align=right | 7.1 km || 
|-id=875 bgcolor=#fefefe
| 214875 ||  || — || September 10, 2007 || Kitt Peak || Spacewatch || — || align=right | 1.1 km || 
|-id=876 bgcolor=#fefefe
| 214876 ||  || — || September 11, 2007 || Catalina || CSS || MAS || align=right data-sort-value="0.95" | 950 m || 
|-id=877 bgcolor=#fefefe
| 214877 ||  || — || September 11, 2007 || Mount Lemmon || Mount Lemmon Survey || — || align=right | 1.1 km || 
|-id=878 bgcolor=#fefefe
| 214878 ||  || — || September 13, 2007 || Socorro || LINEAR || — || align=right | 1.4 km || 
|-id=879 bgcolor=#fefefe
| 214879 ||  || — || September 12, 2007 || Catalina || CSS || H || align=right data-sort-value="0.74" | 740 m || 
|-id=880 bgcolor=#fefefe
| 214880 ||  || — || September 11, 2007 || XuYi || PMO NEO || — || align=right | 1.0 km || 
|-id=881 bgcolor=#fefefe
| 214881 ||  || — || September 10, 2007 || Kitt Peak || Spacewatch || — || align=right data-sort-value="0.89" | 890 m || 
|-id=882 bgcolor=#fefefe
| 214882 ||  || — || September 13, 2007 || Mount Lemmon || Mount Lemmon Survey || V || align=right data-sort-value="0.93" | 930 m || 
|-id=883 bgcolor=#fefefe
| 214883 Yuanxikun ||  ||  || September 11, 2007 || XuYi || PMO NEO || — || align=right | 1.3 km || 
|-id=884 bgcolor=#fefefe
| 214884 ||  || — || September 15, 2007 || Socorro || LINEAR || — || align=right | 1.7 km || 
|-id=885 bgcolor=#E9E9E9
| 214885 ||  || — || September 15, 2007 || Mount Lemmon || Mount Lemmon Survey || — || align=right | 1.8 km || 
|-id=886 bgcolor=#fefefe
| 214886 ||  || — || September 15, 2007 || Mount Lemmon || Mount Lemmon Survey || — || align=right data-sort-value="0.67" | 670 m || 
|-id=887 bgcolor=#d6d6d6
| 214887 ||  || — || September 15, 2007 || Mount Lemmon || Mount Lemmon Survey || THM || align=right | 3.0 km || 
|-id=888 bgcolor=#E9E9E9
| 214888 ||  || — || September 15, 2007 || Mount Lemmon || Mount Lemmon Survey || RAF || align=right | 1.2 km || 
|-id=889 bgcolor=#E9E9E9
| 214889 ||  || — || September 11, 2007 || Mount Lemmon || Mount Lemmon Survey || JUN || align=right | 1.1 km || 
|-id=890 bgcolor=#fefefe
| 214890 ||  || — || September 14, 2007 || Mount Lemmon || Mount Lemmon Survey || NYS || align=right data-sort-value="0.99" | 990 m || 
|-id=891 bgcolor=#fefefe
| 214891 ||  || — || September 12, 2007 || Mount Lemmon || Mount Lemmon Survey || V || align=right data-sort-value="0.79" | 790 m || 
|-id=892 bgcolor=#fefefe
| 214892 ||  || — || September 20, 2007 || Catalina || CSS || H || align=right | 1.1 km || 
|-id=893 bgcolor=#fefefe
| 214893 ||  || — || September 18, 2007 || Kitt Peak || Spacewatch || — || align=right | 1.0 km || 
|-id=894 bgcolor=#E9E9E9
| 214894 ||  || — || October 6, 2007 || Kitt Peak || Spacewatch || — || align=right | 2.1 km || 
|-id=895 bgcolor=#E9E9E9
| 214895 ||  || — || October 8, 2007 || Goodricke-Pigott || R. A. Tucker || — || align=right | 2.6 km || 
|-id=896 bgcolor=#fefefe
| 214896 ||  || — || October 4, 2007 || Kitt Peak || Spacewatch || — || align=right | 1.1 km || 
|-id=897 bgcolor=#fefefe
| 214897 ||  || — || October 7, 2007 || Mount Lemmon || Mount Lemmon Survey || V || align=right data-sort-value="0.80" | 800 m || 
|-id=898 bgcolor=#fefefe
| 214898 ||  || — || October 4, 2007 || Kitt Peak || Spacewatch || MAS || align=right data-sort-value="0.86" | 860 m || 
|-id=899 bgcolor=#fefefe
| 214899 ||  || — || October 7, 2007 || Catalina || CSS || FLO || align=right data-sort-value="0.90" | 900 m || 
|-id=900 bgcolor=#d6d6d6
| 214900 ||  || — || October 8, 2007 || Kitt Peak || Spacewatch || — || align=right | 3.0 km || 
|}

214901–215000 

|-bgcolor=#E9E9E9
| 214901 ||  || — || October 7, 2007 || Catalina || CSS || — || align=right | 3.4 km || 
|-id=902 bgcolor=#fefefe
| 214902 ||  || — || October 8, 2007 || Kitt Peak || Spacewatch || NYS || align=right data-sort-value="0.93" | 930 m || 
|-id=903 bgcolor=#fefefe
| 214903 ||  || — || October 8, 2007 || Kitt Peak || Spacewatch || — || align=right | 1.2 km || 
|-id=904 bgcolor=#fefefe
| 214904 ||  || — || October 15, 2007 || Chante-Perdrix || Chante-Perdrix Obs. || V || align=right data-sort-value="0.99" | 990 m || 
|-id=905 bgcolor=#fefefe
| 214905 ||  || — || October 6, 2007 || Socorro || LINEAR || — || align=right | 1.3 km || 
|-id=906 bgcolor=#d6d6d6
| 214906 ||  || — || October 7, 2007 || Socorro || LINEAR || — || align=right | 5.0 km || 
|-id=907 bgcolor=#E9E9E9
| 214907 ||  || — || October 9, 2007 || Socorro || LINEAR || — || align=right | 2.3 km || 
|-id=908 bgcolor=#fefefe
| 214908 ||  || — || October 11, 2007 || Socorro || LINEAR || MAS || align=right | 1.1 km || 
|-id=909 bgcolor=#fefefe
| 214909 ||  || — || October 7, 2007 || Mount Lemmon || Mount Lemmon Survey || — || align=right | 1.1 km || 
|-id=910 bgcolor=#d6d6d6
| 214910 ||  || — || October 8, 2007 || Anderson Mesa || LONEOS || HIL || align=right | 6.3 km || 
|-id=911 bgcolor=#fefefe
| 214911 Viehboeck ||  ||  || October 11, 2007 || Gaisberg || R. Gierlinger || NYS || align=right data-sort-value="0.76" | 760 m || 
|-id=912 bgcolor=#d6d6d6
| 214912 ||  || — || October 8, 2007 || Kitt Peak || Spacewatch || — || align=right | 3.1 km || 
|-id=913 bgcolor=#E9E9E9
| 214913 ||  || — || October 14, 2007 || Socorro || LINEAR || — || align=right | 2.0 km || 
|-id=914 bgcolor=#fefefe
| 214914 ||  || — || October 7, 2007 || Mount Lemmon || Mount Lemmon Survey || — || align=right data-sort-value="0.69" | 690 m || 
|-id=915 bgcolor=#fefefe
| 214915 ||  || — || October 10, 2007 || Kitt Peak || Spacewatch || — || align=right | 1.0 km || 
|-id=916 bgcolor=#fefefe
| 214916 ||  || — || October 10, 2007 || Kitt Peak || Spacewatch || NYS || align=right data-sort-value="0.71" | 710 m || 
|-id=917 bgcolor=#d6d6d6
| 214917 ||  || — || October 9, 2007 || Kitt Peak || Spacewatch || ANF || align=right | 2.0 km || 
|-id=918 bgcolor=#fefefe
| 214918 ||  || — || October 13, 2007 || Catalina || CSS || FLO || align=right | 1.00 km || 
|-id=919 bgcolor=#fefefe
| 214919 ||  || — || October 14, 2007 || Mount Lemmon || Mount Lemmon Survey || — || align=right | 1.0 km || 
|-id=920 bgcolor=#E9E9E9
| 214920 ||  || — || October 16, 2007 || Kitt Peak || Spacewatch || — || align=right | 1.5 km || 
|-id=921 bgcolor=#fefefe
| 214921 ||  || — || October 16, 2007 || Kitt Peak || Spacewatch || FLO || align=right data-sort-value="0.78" | 780 m || 
|-id=922 bgcolor=#E9E9E9
| 214922 ||  || — || October 18, 2007 || Kitt Peak || Spacewatch || — || align=right | 2.0 km || 
|-id=923 bgcolor=#fefefe
| 214923 ||  || — || October 24, 2007 || Mount Lemmon || Mount Lemmon Survey || — || align=right | 1.4 km || 
|-id=924 bgcolor=#E9E9E9
| 214924 ||  || — || October 24, 2007 || Mount Lemmon || Mount Lemmon Survey || — || align=right | 1.9 km || 
|-id=925 bgcolor=#fefefe
| 214925 ||  || — || October 30, 2007 || Kitt Peak || Spacewatch || — || align=right | 1.0 km || 
|-id=926 bgcolor=#fefefe
| 214926 ||  || — || October 30, 2007 || Kitt Peak || Spacewatch || — || align=right | 1.0 km || 
|-id=927 bgcolor=#fefefe
| 214927 ||  || — || October 30, 2007 || Mount Lemmon || Mount Lemmon Survey || NYS || align=right data-sort-value="0.63" | 630 m || 
|-id=928 bgcolor=#fefefe
| 214928 Carrara ||  ||  || November 5, 2007 || Vallemare di Borbona || V. S. Casulli || — || align=right data-sort-value="0.96" | 960 m || 
|-id=929 bgcolor=#fefefe
| 214929 ||  || — || November 1, 2007 || Kitt Peak || Spacewatch || — || align=right | 1.4 km || 
|-id=930 bgcolor=#fefefe
| 214930 ||  || — || November 1, 2007 || Kitt Peak || Spacewatch || — || align=right | 1.3 km || 
|-id=931 bgcolor=#fefefe
| 214931 ||  || — || November 1, 2007 || Kitt Peak || Spacewatch || — || align=right | 1.3 km || 
|-id=932 bgcolor=#fefefe
| 214932 ||  || — || November 5, 2007 || Kitt Peak || Spacewatch || — || align=right | 2.0 km || 
|-id=933 bgcolor=#fefefe
| 214933 ||  || — || November 5, 2007 || Kitt Peak || Spacewatch || ERI || align=right | 1.9 km || 
|-id=934 bgcolor=#fefefe
| 214934 ||  || — || November 5, 2007 || Kitt Peak || Spacewatch || — || align=right data-sort-value="0.83" | 830 m || 
|-id=935 bgcolor=#E9E9E9
| 214935 ||  || — || November 5, 2007 || Mount Lemmon || Mount Lemmon Survey || — || align=right | 1.4 km || 
|-id=936 bgcolor=#E9E9E9
| 214936 ||  || — || November 4, 2007 || Mount Lemmon || Mount Lemmon Survey || HOF || align=right | 4.2 km || 
|-id=937 bgcolor=#E9E9E9
| 214937 ||  || — || November 9, 2007 || Kitt Peak || Spacewatch || — || align=right | 2.4 km || 
|-id=938 bgcolor=#E9E9E9
| 214938 ||  || — || November 9, 2007 || Kitt Peak || Spacewatch || — || align=right | 1.3 km || 
|-id=939 bgcolor=#fefefe
| 214939 ||  || — || November 15, 2007 || Marly || P. Kocher || — || align=right | 1.0 km || 
|-id=940 bgcolor=#E9E9E9
| 214940 ||  || — || November 9, 2007 || Catalina || CSS || — || align=right | 2.8 km || 
|-id=941 bgcolor=#fefefe
| 214941 ||  || — || November 14, 2007 || Anderson Mesa || LONEOS || FLO || align=right data-sort-value="0.94" | 940 m || 
|-id=942 bgcolor=#E9E9E9
| 214942 ||  || — || November 13, 2007 || Mount Lemmon || Mount Lemmon Survey || — || align=right | 1.1 km || 
|-id=943 bgcolor=#fefefe
| 214943 ||  || — || November 13, 2007 || Kitt Peak || Spacewatch || — || align=right data-sort-value="0.93" | 930 m || 
|-id=944 bgcolor=#E9E9E9
| 214944 ||  || — || November 8, 2007 || Catalina || CSS || — || align=right | 1.9 km || 
|-id=945 bgcolor=#E9E9E9
| 214945 ||  || — || November 13, 2007 || Kitt Peak || Spacewatch || — || align=right | 2.7 km || 
|-id=946 bgcolor=#fefefe
| 214946 ||  || — || November 14, 2007 || Kitt Peak || Spacewatch || NYS || align=right data-sort-value="0.92" | 920 m || 
|-id=947 bgcolor=#E9E9E9
| 214947 ||  || — || November 9, 2007 || Catalina || CSS || ADE || align=right | 2.5 km || 
|-id=948 bgcolor=#E9E9E9
| 214948 ||  || — || November 12, 2007 || Mount Lemmon || Mount Lemmon Survey || — || align=right | 2.0 km || 
|-id=949 bgcolor=#E9E9E9
| 214949 ||  || — || November 2, 2007 || Mount Lemmon || Mount Lemmon Survey || HEN || align=right | 1.3 km || 
|-id=950 bgcolor=#E9E9E9
| 214950 ||  || — || November 18, 2007 || Mount Lemmon || Mount Lemmon Survey || — || align=right | 3.2 km || 
|-id=951 bgcolor=#E9E9E9
| 214951 ||  || — || November 19, 2007 || Mount Lemmon || Mount Lemmon Survey || MAR || align=right | 1.5 km || 
|-id=952 bgcolor=#fefefe
| 214952 ||  || — || November 18, 2007 || Mount Lemmon || Mount Lemmon Survey || — || align=right | 1.1 km || 
|-id=953 bgcolor=#fefefe
| 214953 Giugavazzi ||  ||  || November 29, 2007 || San Marcello || L. Tesi, G. Fagioli || V || align=right | 1.0 km || 
|-id=954 bgcolor=#fefefe
| 214954 ||  || — || November 17, 2007 || Kitt Peak || Spacewatch || — || align=right | 1.2 km || 
|-id=955 bgcolor=#fefefe
| 214955 ||  || — || December 5, 2007 || Mount Lemmon || Mount Lemmon Survey || — || align=right | 1.2 km || 
|-id=956 bgcolor=#E9E9E9
| 214956 ||  || — || December 15, 2007 || OAM || OAM Obs. || HOF || align=right | 3.3 km || 
|-id=957 bgcolor=#fefefe
| 214957 ||  || — || December 15, 2007 || Catalina || CSS || V || align=right data-sort-value="0.93" | 930 m || 
|-id=958 bgcolor=#E9E9E9
| 214958 ||  || — || December 12, 2007 || Socorro || LINEAR || — || align=right | 1.3 km || 
|-id=959 bgcolor=#E9E9E9
| 214959 ||  || — || December 13, 2007 || Socorro || LINEAR || GEF || align=right | 4.8 km || 
|-id=960 bgcolor=#d6d6d6
| 214960 ||  || — || December 15, 2007 || Kitt Peak || Spacewatch || KOR || align=right | 1.4 km || 
|-id=961 bgcolor=#d6d6d6
| 214961 ||  || — || December 6, 2007 || Mount Lemmon || Mount Lemmon Survey || — || align=right | 4.5 km || 
|-id=962 bgcolor=#d6d6d6
| 214962 ||  || — || December 17, 2007 || Kitt Peak || Spacewatch || — || align=right | 5.0 km || 
|-id=963 bgcolor=#E9E9E9
| 214963 ||  || — || December 30, 2007 || Mount Lemmon || Mount Lemmon Survey || EUN || align=right | 1.8 km || 
|-id=964 bgcolor=#E9E9E9
| 214964 ||  || — || December 30, 2007 || Mount Lemmon || Mount Lemmon Survey || — || align=right | 3.2 km || 
|-id=965 bgcolor=#d6d6d6
| 214965 ||  || — || December 30, 2007 || Kitt Peak || Spacewatch || — || align=right | 5.3 km || 
|-id=966 bgcolor=#d6d6d6
| 214966 ||  || — || December 31, 2007 || Catalina || CSS || — || align=right | 4.1 km || 
|-id=967 bgcolor=#E9E9E9
| 214967 ||  || — || December 18, 2007 || Mount Lemmon || Mount Lemmon Survey || — || align=right | 3.7 km || 
|-id=968 bgcolor=#E9E9E9
| 214968 ||  || — || December 30, 2007 || Catalina || CSS || PAD || align=right | 3.0 km || 
|-id=969 bgcolor=#E9E9E9
| 214969 ||  || — || December 30, 2007 || Mount Lemmon || Mount Lemmon Survey || — || align=right | 1.1 km || 
|-id=970 bgcolor=#d6d6d6
| 214970 ||  || — || January 1, 2008 || Schiaparelli || Schiaparelli Obs. || URS || align=right | 5.4 km || 
|-id=971 bgcolor=#d6d6d6
| 214971 ||  || — || January 7, 2008 || Lulin || LUSS || — || align=right | 3.8 km || 
|-id=972 bgcolor=#d6d6d6
| 214972 ||  || — || January 10, 2008 || Mount Lemmon || Mount Lemmon Survey || — || align=right | 4.1 km || 
|-id=973 bgcolor=#E9E9E9
| 214973 ||  || — || January 10, 2008 || Mount Lemmon || Mount Lemmon Survey || — || align=right | 3.2 km || 
|-id=974 bgcolor=#E9E9E9
| 214974 ||  || — || January 11, 2008 || Kitt Peak || Spacewatch || HOF || align=right | 4.1 km || 
|-id=975 bgcolor=#d6d6d6
| 214975 ||  || — || January 11, 2008 || Kitt Peak || Spacewatch || KOR || align=right | 1.5 km || 
|-id=976 bgcolor=#d6d6d6
| 214976 ||  || — || January 11, 2008 || Kitt Peak || Spacewatch || THM || align=right | 2.7 km || 
|-id=977 bgcolor=#d6d6d6
| 214977 ||  || — || January 11, 2008 || Kitt Peak || Spacewatch || — || align=right | 3.8 km || 
|-id=978 bgcolor=#d6d6d6
| 214978 ||  || — || January 11, 2008 || Kitt Peak || Spacewatch || — || align=right | 4.0 km || 
|-id=979 bgcolor=#E9E9E9
| 214979 ||  || — || January 12, 2008 || Mount Lemmon || Mount Lemmon Survey || — || align=right | 2.0 km || 
|-id=980 bgcolor=#d6d6d6
| 214980 ||  || — || January 14, 2008 || Kitt Peak || Spacewatch || — || align=right | 4.5 km || 
|-id=981 bgcolor=#d6d6d6
| 214981 ||  || — || January 14, 2008 || Kitt Peak || Spacewatch || URS || align=right | 5.4 km || 
|-id=982 bgcolor=#E9E9E9
| 214982 ||  || — || January 12, 2008 || Kitt Peak || Spacewatch || AGN || align=right | 1.9 km || 
|-id=983 bgcolor=#E9E9E9
| 214983 ||  || — || January 12, 2008 || Kitt Peak || Spacewatch || — || align=right | 2.5 km || 
|-id=984 bgcolor=#d6d6d6
| 214984 ||  || — || January 12, 2008 || Kitt Peak || Spacewatch || — || align=right | 3.2 km || 
|-id=985 bgcolor=#d6d6d6
| 214985 ||  || — || January 15, 2008 || Kitt Peak || Spacewatch || — || align=right | 3.3 km || 
|-id=986 bgcolor=#E9E9E9
| 214986 ||  || — || January 11, 2008 || Mount Lemmon || Mount Lemmon Survey || PAD || align=right | 2.0 km || 
|-id=987 bgcolor=#d6d6d6
| 214987 ||  || — || January 11, 2008 || Kitt Peak || Spacewatch || THM || align=right | 3.7 km || 
|-id=988 bgcolor=#d6d6d6
| 214988 ||  || — || January 20, 2008 || Mount Lemmon || Mount Lemmon Survey || EOS || align=right | 2.3 km || 
|-id=989 bgcolor=#d6d6d6
| 214989 ||  || — || January 30, 2008 || OAM || OAM Obs. || — || align=right | 4.2 km || 
|-id=990 bgcolor=#d6d6d6
| 214990 ||  || — || January 31, 2008 || Catalina || CSS || — || align=right | 4.3 km || 
|-id=991 bgcolor=#d6d6d6
| 214991 ||  || — || February 7, 2008 || Altschwendt || W. Ries || — || align=right | 2.9 km || 
|-id=992 bgcolor=#d6d6d6
| 214992 ||  || — || February 1, 2008 || Kitt Peak || Spacewatch || — || align=right | 4.5 km || 
|-id=993 bgcolor=#d6d6d6
| 214993 ||  || — || February 2, 2008 || Kitt Peak || Spacewatch || — || align=right | 4.0 km || 
|-id=994 bgcolor=#d6d6d6
| 214994 ||  || — || February 2, 2008 || Mount Lemmon || Mount Lemmon Survey || — || align=right | 3.8 km || 
|-id=995 bgcolor=#d6d6d6
| 214995 ||  || — || February 2, 2008 || Catalina || CSS || — || align=right | 5.2 km || 
|-id=996 bgcolor=#d6d6d6
| 214996 ||  || — || February 2, 2008 || Catalina || CSS || — || align=right | 4.5 km || 
|-id=997 bgcolor=#d6d6d6
| 214997 ||  || — || February 3, 2008 || Catalina || CSS || — || align=right | 4.2 km || 
|-id=998 bgcolor=#d6d6d6
| 214998 ||  || — || February 6, 2008 || Catalina || CSS || CHA || align=right | 2.7 km || 
|-id=999 bgcolor=#d6d6d6
| 214999 ||  || — || February 8, 2008 || Kitt Peak || Spacewatch || CHA || align=right | 2.6 km || 
|-id=000 bgcolor=#d6d6d6
| 215000 ||  || — || February 8, 2008 || Kitt Peak || Spacewatch || — || align=right | 3.5 km || 
|}

References

External links 
 Discovery Circumstances: Numbered Minor Planets (210001)–(215000) (IAU Minor Planet Center)

0214